= List of stars in Eridanus =

This is the list of notable stars in the constellation Eridanus, sorted by decreasing brightness.

Name	B	F	G.	Var	HD	HIP	RA	Dec	vis. mag.	abs. mag.	Dist. (ly)	Sp. class	Notes
Achernar	α		2		10144	7588	01^{h} 37^{m} 42.75^{s}	−57° 14′ 12.0″	0.45	−2.77	144	B3Vp	8th-brightest star; Be star
β Eri	β	67	290		33111	23875	05^{h} 07^{m} 51.03^{s}	−05° 05′ 10.5″	2.78	0.60	89	A3IIIvar	Cursa, Kursa.
θ^{1} Eri	θ^{1}		48		18622	13847	02^{h} 58^{m} 15.72^{s}	−40° 18′ 17.0″	2.88	−0.59	161	A4III+...	Acamar, Achr al Nahr, Postrema Fluminis; binary star with θ^{2} Eri.
γ Eri	γ	34	158		25025	18543	03^{h} 58^{m} 01.73^{s}	−13° 30′ 29.7″	2.97	−1.19	192	M1IIIb Ca-1	Zaurak, Zaurac, Zaurack
δ Eri	δ	23	121		23249	17378	03^{h} 43^{m} 14.96^{s}	−09° 45′ 54.7″	3.52	3.74	29	K0IV	Rana; RS CVn variable
υ^{4} Eri	υ^{4}	41	204		27376	20042	04^{h} 17^{m} 53.62^{s}	−33° 47′ 54.0″	3.55	−0.14	178	B9V	Variable star
φ Eri	φ		14		14228	10602	02^{h} 16^{m} 30.50^{s}	−51° 30′ 43.6″	3.56	0.18	155	B8IV-V	
χ Eri	χ		7		11937	9007	01^{h} 55^{m} 56.83^{s}	−51° 36′ 34.5″	3.69	2.48	57	G5IV	
τ^{4} Eri	τ^{4}	16	81		20720	15474	03^{h} 19^{m} 30.97^{s}	−21° 45′ 28.6″	3.70	−0.79	258	M3/M4III	
ε Eri	ε	18	101		22049	16537	03^{h} 32^{m} 56.42^{s}	−09° 27′ 29.9″	3.72	6.18	10	K2V	Ran,; 9th-nearest star system; has two asteroid belts, dust disk, one planet (b) and one unconfirmed planet (c); BY Draconis variable
υ^{2} Eri	υ^{2}	52	251		29291	21393	04^{h} 35^{m} 33.07^{s}	−30° 33′ 44.3″	3.81	−0.22	209	G8III	Beemin, Theemin
53 Eri	l	53	254		29503	21594	04^{h} 38^{m} 10.87^{s}	−14° 18′ 12.9″	3.86	1.23	109	K1III	Sceptrum
η Eri	η	3	39		18322	13701	02^{h} 56^{m} 25.60^{s}	−08° 53′ 51.4″	3.89	0.83	133	K1III-IV	Azha
ν Eri	ν	48	250		29248	21444	04^{h} 36^{m} 19.14^{s}	−03° 21′ 08.8″	3.93	−2.34	586	B2III SB	β Cep variable
υ^{3} Eri	υ^{3}	43	219		28028	20535	04^{h} 24^{m} 02.17^{s}	−34° 01′ 01.2″	3.97	−0.64	273	K4III	Beemim
μ Eri	μ	57	266		30211	22109	04^{h} 45^{m} 30.14^{s}	−03° 15′ 16.6″	4.01	−2.05	532	B5IV	
ο^{1} Eri	ο^{1}	38	185		26574	19587	04^{h} 11^{m} 51.93^{s}	−06° 50′ 16.0″	4.04	1.11	125	F2II-III	Beid; δ Sct variable
τ^{3} Eri	τ^{3}	11	56		18978	14146	03^{h} 02^{m} 23.59^{s}	−23° 37′ 27.6″	4.08	1.97	86	A4V	
ι Eri	ι		19		16815	12486	02^{h} 40^{m} 39.93^{s}	−39° 51′ 19.1″	4.11	0.86	145	K0III	
HD 24160	g		138		24160	17874	03^{h} 49^{m} 27.28^{s}	−36° 12′ 00.4″	4.17	0.13	210	G8III	= υ^{6} Eridani
τ^{6} Eri	τ^{6}	27	128		23754	17651	03^{h} 46^{m} 50.99^{s}	−23° 14′ 54.4″	4.22	2.95	58	F3/F5V	= n Eridani
κ Eri	κ		16		15371	11407	02^{h} 26^{m} 59.10^{s}	−47° 42′ 13.8″	4.24	−1.81	528	B5IV	
λ Eri	λ	69	293		33328	23972	05^{h} 09^{m} 08.78^{s}	−08° 45′ 14.7″	4.25	−4.40	1753	B2IVn	β Cep variable
82 G. Eri	e		82		20794	15510	03^{h} 19^{m} 53.22^{s}	−43° 04′ 17.6″	4.26	5.35	20	G8V	nearby; at least three planets (b), (d) and (e); also has a debris disk
τ^{5} Eri	τ^{5}	19	103		22203	16611	03^{h} 33^{m} 47.25^{s}	−21° 37′ 58.1″	4.26	−0.53	296	B9V	
HD 24071	f		135		24071	17797	03^{h} 48^{m} 35.82^{s}	−37° 37′ 12.5″	4.30	0.83	173	A+...	= υ^{5} Eri; B component of double star with 136 G. Eri
54 Eri		54	259	DM	29755	21763	04^{h} 40^{m} 26.49^{s}	−19° 40′ 16.5″	4.32	−0.90	361	M3/M4III	DM Eri
θ^{2} Eri	θ^{2}		49		18623	13847	02^{h} 58^{m} 16.30^{s}	−40° 18′ 16.0″	4.35		161		Binary star with θ^{1} Eri
ω Eri	ω	61	276		31109	22701	04^{h} 52^{m} 53.68^{s}	−05° 27′ 09.9″	4.36	0.15	227	A9IV	Rabah al Nahr, Quarta Fluminis
π Eri	π	26	127		23614	17593	03^{h} 46^{m} 08.50^{s}	−12° 06′ 06.2″	4.43	−1.49	497	M1III	
40 Eri A	ο^{2}	40	197	DY	26965	19849	04^{h} 15^{m} 17.64^{s}	−07° 38′ 40.4″	4.43	5.92	16	K1V	Keid; DY Eri; nearby triple star; has a planet (b)
32 Eri A	w	32			24554	18255	03^{h} 54^{m} 17.49^{s}	−02° 57′ 17.0″	4.46	−0.66	345	G8III	double star
τ^{1} Eri	τ^{1}	1	22		17206	12843	02^{h} 45^{m} 05.98^{s}	−18° 34′ 21.5″	4.47	3.74	46	F5/F6V	
υ^{1} Eri	υ^{1}	50	243		29085	21248	04^{h} 33^{m} 30.63^{s}	−29° 45′ 57.0″	4.49	1.58	124	K0III	Theemin, Beemin
HD 22663	y		110		22663	16870	03^{h} 37^{m} 05.68^{s}	−40° 16′ 28.2″	4.57	0.43	219	K0III	
HD 23319	h		124		23319	17351	03^{h} 42^{m} 50.12^{s}	−37° 18′ 48.0″	4.59	0.91	178	K2IIICN...	= υ^{7} Eridani
τ^{9} Eri	τ^{9}	36	161		25267	18673	03^{h} 59^{m} 55.48^{s}	−24° 00′ 58.5″	4.62	−0.41	331	Ap Si	= k Eri; α² CVn variable
τ^{8} Eri	τ^{8}	33	149		24587	18216	03^{h} 53^{m} 42.68^{s}	−24° 36′ 44.0″	4.64	−0.72	385	B5V	SX Ari variable
f Eri	f		136		24072		03^{h} 48^{m} 35.90^{s}	−37° 37′ 14.0″	4.73		173	B9V	= υ^{5} Eri; A component of double star with 135 G. Eri
HD 16754	s		18		16754	12413	02^{h} 39^{m} 47.92^{s}	−42° 53′ 29.9″	4.74	1.74	130	A2V	
17 Eri	v	17	97		21790	16341	03^{h} 30^{m} 37.05^{s}	−05° 04′ 30.6″	4.74	−0.60	380	B9Vs	
τ^{2} Eri	τ^{2}	2	30		17824	13288	02^{h} 51^{m} 02.35^{s}	−21° 00′ 14.3″	4.76	1.02	183	K0III	Angetenar
64 Eri		64	283	S	32045	23231	04^{h} 59^{m} 55.71^{s}	−12° 32′ 13.9″	4.78	0.03	291	F0V	S Eri; variable
32 Eri B	w	32	148		24555	18255	03^{h} 54^{m} 17.50^{s}	−02° 57′ 17.0″	4.79	−0.33	345	A2V	component of the 32 Eri system
ζ Eri	ζ	13	73		20320	15197	03^{h} 15^{m} 50.03^{s}	−08° 49′ 11.4″	4.80	1.97	120	A5m	Zibal
ψ Eri	ψ	65	285		32249	23364	05^{h} 01^{m} 26.34^{s}	−07° 10′ 26.3″	4.80	−2.54	956	B3V	
15 Eri		15	79		20610	15382	03^{h} 18^{m} 22.10^{s}	−22° 30′ 40.1″	4.86	0.39	255	K0III	
39 Eri	A	39	194		26846	19777	04^{h} 14^{m} 23.69^{s}	−10° 15′ 21.2″	4.87	0.86	206	K3III	
45 Eri		45	231		28749	21139	04^{h} 31^{m} 52.67^{s}	−00° 02′ 38.4″	4.91	−2.12	830	K3II-III	
HD 29573			255		29573	21644	04^{h} 38^{m} 53.59^{s}	−12° 07′ 23.1″	4.99	0.77	227	A0V	
60 Eri		60	274		30814	22479	04^{h} 50^{m} 11.59^{s}	−16° 13′ 02.2″	5.03	0.67	243	K0III	
HD 10939	q^{2}		6		10939	8241	01^{h} 46^{m} 06.14^{s}	−53° 31′ 19.9″	5.04	1.26	186	A1V	
HD 24626	i		151		24626	18213	03^{h} 53^{m} 38.92^{s}	−34° 43′ 56.3″	5.11	−0.07	355	B6/B7V	
68 Eri		68	292		33256	23941	05^{h} 08^{m} 43.67^{s}	−04° 27′ 22.5″	5.11	3.12	82	F2V	
66 Eri		66	288	EN	32964	23794	05^{h} 06^{m} 45.65^{s}	−04° 39′ 18.6″	5.12	0.45	280	B9.5V	EN Eri; α² CVn variable
40 G. Eri			40		18331	13717	02^{h} 56^{m} 37.45^{s}	−03° 42′ 44.0″	5.16	1.35	189	A3Vn	
ξ Eri	ξ	42	215		27861	20507	04^{h} 23^{m} 40.88^{s}	−03° 44′ 43.2″	5.17	1.14	208	A2V	
47 Eri		47	241	DV	29064	21296	04^{h} 34^{m} 11.64^{s}	−08° 13′ 52.9″	5.20	−1.76	805	M3III	DV Eri
43 G. Eri			43		18543	13874	02^{h} 58^{m} 42.09^{s}	−02° 46′ 57.8″	5.22	0.26	320	A2IV	
51 Eri	c	51	252		29391	21547	04^{h} 37^{m} 36.11^{s}	−02° 28′ 24.2″	5.22	2.85	97	F0V	has a planet (b); indications that a young Jupiter-like planet has been directly imaged in wide-orbit via Gemini Planet Imager
61 G. Eri	ρ^{4}		61		19349	14456	03^{h} 06^{m} 33.49^{s}	−06° 05′ 18.8″	5.23	−0.84	534	M3III	
20 Eri		20	107	EG	22470	16803	03^{h} 36^{m} 17.39^{s}	−17° 28′ 01.3″	5.24	−0.57	473	B8/B9III	EG Eri; α² CVn variable
24 Eri		24	123		23363	17457	03^{h} 44^{m} 30.51^{s}	−01° 09′ 47.1″	5.24	−1.27	653	B7V	
τ^{7} Eri	τ^{7}	28	130		23878	17717	03^{h} 47^{m} 39.62^{s}	−23° 52′ 29.3″	5.24	0.63	272	A1V	= m Eridani
242 G. Eri			242		29065	21297	04^{h} 34^{m} 11.79^{s}	−08° 58′ 11.9″	5.24	−1.28	657	K4III	
ρ^{3} Eri	ρ^{3}	10	57		19107	14293	03^{h} 04^{m} 16.48^{s}	−07° 36′ 03.2″	5.26	2.09	140	A8V	
35 Eri		35	162		25340	18788	04^{h} 01^{m} 32.03^{s}	−01° 32′ 58.7″	5.28	−0.43	453	B5V	
ρ^{2} Eri	ρ^{2}	9	55		18953	14168	03^{h} 02^{m} 42.26^{s}	−07° 41′ 07.7″	5.32	0.83	258	K0II-III	
164 G. Eri			164		25457	18859	04^{h} 02^{m} 36.66^{s}	−00° 16′ 05.9″	5.38	3.96	63	F5V	
212 G. Eri			212		27616	20264	04^{h} 20^{m} 39.00^{s}	−20° 38′ 22.6″	5.38	−0.38	462	A0V	
63 Eri		63	282		32008	23221	04^{h} 59^{m} 50.44^{s}	−10° 15′ 46.8″	5.39	1.70	178	G4V	
4 Eri		4	41		18454	13782	02^{h} 57^{m} 23.70^{s}	−23° 51′ 43.5″	5.44	2.00	159	A5IV/V	
37 Eri		37	183		26409	19483	04^{h} 10^{m} 22.52^{s}	−06° 55′ 25.8″	5.44	0.13	377	G8III	
GU Eri			181		26326	19398	04^{h} 09^{m} 17.84^{s}	−16° 23′ 09.2″	5.45	−1.29	726	B5IV	
257 G. Eri			257		29613	21685	04^{h} 39^{m} 19.64^{s}	−14° 21′ 32.0″	5.46	1.54	199	K0III	
30 Eri		30	144		24388	18141	03^{h} 52^{m} 41.65^{s}	−05° 21′ 40.5″	5.48	−0.46	502	B8+...	
58 Eri		58	269	IX	30495	22263	04^{h} 47^{m} 36.21^{s}	−16° 56′ 05.5″	5.49	4.87	43	G3V	IX Eri; BY Draconis variable
83 G. Eri			83		20894	15643	03^{h} 21^{m} 24.03^{s}	−23° 38′ 06.3″	5.50	−0.05	421	G8III	
62 Eri	b	62	280		31512	22958	04^{h} 56^{m} 24.19^{s}	−05° 10′ 16.9″	5.50	−1.28	739	B6V	
HD 10647	q^{1}		5		10647	7978	01^{h} 42^{m} 29.15^{s}	−53° 44′ 26.1″	5.52	4.32	57	F8V	has a planet (b); also has a debris disk
22 Eri		22	115	FY	22920	17167	03^{h} 40^{m} 38.33^{s}	−05° 12′ 38.5″	5.53	−1.25	739	B9IIIp Si	FY Eri; α² CVn variable
264 G. Eri			264		30127	22028	04^{h} 44^{m} 07.95^{s}	−18° 39′ 59.6″	5.53	0.75	295	A1V	
5 Eri		5	46		18633	13951	02^{h} 59^{m} 41.16^{s}	−02° 27′ 53.6″	5.56	0.51	334	B9.5V	
106 G. Eri			106		22409	16780	03^{h} 35^{m} 57.65^{s}	−11° 11′ 38.3″	5.56	0.23	379	G7III:	
25 Eri		25	125		23413	17506	03^{h} 44^{m} 56.46^{s}	−00° 17′ 48.2″	5.56	0.40	351	K4III	
258 G. Eri			258		29737	21743	04^{h} 40^{m} 06.85^{s}	−24° 28′ 56.7″	5.56	0.63	315	G6/G8III	
94 G. Eri			94		21688	16263	03^{h} 29^{m} 36.02^{s}	−12° 40′ 29.1″	5.57	0.02	420	A5III/IV	
122 G. Eri			122		23281	17395	03^{h} 43^{m} 33.84^{s}	−10° 29′ 08.2″	5.59	2.43	140	A5m	
174 G. Eri			174		25945	19095	04^{h} 05^{m} 37.30^{s}	−27° 39′ 07.3″	5.59	2.41	141	F0IV/V	
160 G. Eri			160		25165	18647	03^{h} 59^{m} 30.13^{s}	−12° 34′ 27.6″	5.61	−1.57	891	K4III	
DU Eri			228	DU	28497	20922	04^{h} 29^{m} 06.93^{s}	−13° 02′ 54.1″	5.61	−2.81	1575	B2V:ne	γ Cas variable; Be star
169 G. Eri			169		25723	19011	04^{h} 04^{m} 22.71^{s}	−12° 47′ 32.4″	5.62	0.17	401	K1III	
153 G. Eri			153		24744	18262	03^{h} 54^{m} 23.18^{s}	−40° 21′ 25.3″	5.70	−0.30	516	K0III...	
184 G. Eri			184		26464	19511	04^{h} 10^{m} 47.74^{s}	−08° 49′ 11.4″	5.70	0.71	324	G9III:	
46 Eri		46	239	EH	29009	21278	04^{h} 33^{m} 54.73^{s}	−06° 44′ 20.0″	5.71	−1.18	780	B9p Si	EH Eri; α² CVn variable
278 G. Eri			278		31414	22860	04^{h} 55^{m} 06.82^{s}	−16° 44′ 26.3″	5.71	−0.11	476	G8/K0III	
R Eri			279	R	31444	22881	04^{h} 55^{m} 18.64^{s}	−16° 25′ 04.3″	5.71	0.98	288	G6/G8III	Non-variable despite designation
80 G. Eri			80		20631	15411	03^{h} 18^{m} 41.07^{s}	−18° 33′ 34.7″	5.72	2.90	119	F3V	
267 G. Eri			267		30238	22086	04^{h} 45^{m} 04.15^{s}	−21° 17′ 00.0″	5.72	−0.70	627	K4III	
91 G. Eri			91		21530	16142	03^{h} 28^{m} 00.95^{s}	−11° 17′ 11.4″	5.74	0.65	340	K2III	
ρ^{1} Eri	ρ^{1}	8	52		18784	14060	03^{h} 01^{m} 09.97^{s}	−07° 39′ 46.2″	5.75	0.90	304	K0II	
HD 10360	p		4		10360	7751	01^{h} 39^{m} 47.24^{s}	−56° 11′ 47.2″	5.76	6.21	27	K0V	binary star with 3 G. Eridani
HD 10361	p		3		10361	7751	01^{h} 39^{m} 47.80^{s}	−56° 11′ 41.0″	5.76	6.21	27	K5V	binary star with 4 G. Eridani
99 G. Eri			99		21882	16285	03^{h} 29^{m} 55.19^{s}	−42° 38′ 03.3″	5.76	1.79	203	A5V	
DZ Eri	ν^{1}		234	DZ	28843	21192	04^{h} 32^{m} 37.54^{s}	−03° 12′ 34.2″	5.76	0.17	428	B9III	SX Ari variable
59 Eri		59	271		30606	22325	04^{h} 48^{m} 32.53^{s}	−16° 19′ 46.5″	5.76	2.67	135	F8V	
HD 30562			270		30562	22336	04^{h} 48^{m} 36.20^{s}	−05° 40′ 24.4″	5.77	3.65	86	F8V	has a planet (b)
56 Eri		56	263	DX	30076	22024	04^{h} 44^{m} 05.32^{s}	−08° 30′ 12.9″	5.78	−2.29	1342	B2Ve	DX Eri; γ Cas variable; Be star
GW Eri			187	GW	26591	19571	04^{h} 11^{m} 36.18^{s}	−20° 21′ 22.6″	5.80	1.38	250	A1V + (F/G)	Algol variable
291 G. Eri			291		33224	23916	05^{h} 08^{m} 20.19^{s}	−08° 39′ 55.0″	5.80	−1.04	760	B8V	
58 G. Eri	r		58		19141	14187	03^{h} 02^{m} 55.84^{s}	−46° 58′ 30.2″	5.81	−1.20	821	K2/K3III	
132 G. Eri			132		23978	17798	03^{h} 48^{m} 35.72^{s}	−20° 54′ 10.6″	5.81	−1.22	830	K5III	
216 G. Eri			216		27881	20465	04^{h} 23^{m} 05.66^{s}	−24° 53′ 31.6″	5.81	0.09	454	K5III	
6 Eri		6	44		18535	13835	02^{h} 58^{m} 05.69^{s}	−23° 36′ 22.1″	5.82	−0.69	653	K2III	
53 G. Eri			53		18885	14110	03^{h} 01^{m} 56.09^{s}	−09° 57′ 41.0″	5.84	1.15	282	G6III:	
159 G. Eri			159		25069	18606	03^{h} 58^{m} 52.39^{s}	−05° 28′ 11.8″	5.83	2.52	152	K0/1III	
EM Eri	d		210	EM	27563	20271	04^{h} 20^{m} 42.83^{s}	−07° 35′ 33.0″	5.85	−0.98	756	B5III	
109 G. Eri			109		22675	16989	03^{h} 38^{m} 29.25^{s}	−07° 23′ 30.2″	5.86	0.47	390	G5III:	
211 G. Eri			211		27611	20341	04^{h} 21^{m} 27.05^{s}	−00° 05′ 52.3″	5.86	0.08	467	K2	
287 G. Eri			287		32393	23475	05^{h} 02^{m} 45.37^{s}	−04° 12′ 36.5″	5.86	0.96	311	K3	
15 G. Eri			15		14943	11102	02^{h} 22^{m} 54.65^{s}	−51° 05′ 32.2″	5.90	1.96	200	A5V	
129 G. Eri			129		23887	17805	03^{h} 48^{m} 38.92^{s}	+00° 13′ 40.3″	5.91	0.00	495	K3III	
HR 968			71		20121	14913	03^{h} 12^{m} 25.68^{s}	−44° 25′ 10.8″	5.92	2.71	143	F3V+...	
35 G. Eri			35		18071	13479	02^{h} 53^{m} 35.27^{s}	−22° 22′ 34.0″	5.93	1.08	304	G8/K0III	
163 G. Eri			163		25371	18723	04^{h} 00^{m} 40.62^{s}	−30° 29′ 26.6″	5.93	0.72	359	A1V	
202 G. Eri			202		27179	19996	04^{h} 17^{m} 19.23^{s}	−06° 28′ 19.8″	5.95	−0.19	551	G8III:	
227 G. Eri			227		28479	20892	04^{h} 28^{m} 39.01^{s}	−19° 27′ 31.0″	5.95	0.97	323	K2III	
233 G. Eri			233		28776	21042	04^{h} 30^{m} 40.33^{s}	−35° 39′ 12.9″	5.95	0.70	365	K0II	
21 Eri		21	111		22713	17027	03^{h} 39^{m} 01.13^{s}	−05° 37′ 32.5″	5.97	3.24	115	K1V	
55 Eri A		55	262		30020	21986	04^{h} 43^{m} 34.73^{s}	−08° 47′ 39.3″	5.98	0.51	405	F4IIIp (Sr)	
DO Eri			152	DO	24712	18339	03^{h} 55^{m} 16.17^{s}	−12° 05′ 56.6″	5.99	2.54	160	Ap SrEu(Cr)	α² CVn variable
GZ Eri			203	GZ	27362	20075	04^{h} 18^{m} 16.07^{s}	−20° 42′ 55.1″	6.00	−1.53	1045	M4III	
93 G. Eri			93		21665	16266	03^{h} 29^{m} 39.19^{s}	−06° 48′ 15.3″	6.01	0.71	374	G5	
HD 17925			32		17925	13402	02^{h} 52^{m} 31.89^{s}	−12° 46′ 09.3″	6.05	5.97	34	K1V	EP Eri, RS CVn variable
236 G. Eri			236		28970	21239	04^{h} 33^{m} 22.09^{s}	−10° 47′ 07.5″	6.06	−1.25	945	K0	
64 G. Eri			64		19836	14819	03^{h} 11^{m} 18.78^{s}	−03° 48′ 41.6″	6.08	−0.82	784	M1III	
214 G. Eri			214		27710	20347	04^{h} 21^{m} 31.29^{s}	−25° 43′ 42.4″	6.08	2.40	177	F2V	
20 G. Eri			20		17006	12611	02^{h} 42^{m} 08.44^{s}	−46° 31′ 27.2″	6.09	3.03	133	G8IV	
205 G. Eri			205		27411	20106	04^{h} 18^{m} 37.46^{s}	−22° 58′ 11.4″	6.09	1.27	300	A3m...	
240 G. Eri			240		29063	21298	04^{h} 34^{m} 14.21^{s}	−06° 50′ 15.8″	6.09	0.11	513	K2III	
10 G. Eri			10		12042	9085	01^{h} 56^{m} 59.66^{s}	−51° 46′ 00.7″	6.10	4.00	86	F8V	
7 Eri		7	51		18760	14040	03^{h} 00^{m} 50.88^{s}	−02° 52′ 43.1″	6.11	−0.79	782	M2III	CV Eri
222 G. Eri			222		28312	20765	04^{h} 26^{m} 56.93^{s}	−24° 04′ 52.6″	6.11	0.88	362	A3V	
256 G. Eri			256		29610	21718	04^{h} 39^{m} 47.21^{s}	−01° 03′ 08.8″	6.11	−0.13	578	K0	
100 G. Eri	z		100		21899	16310	03^{h} 30^{m} 13.59^{s}	−41° 22′ 10.3″	6.12	3.46	111	F7V	
171 G. Eri			171		25803	19037	04^{h} 04^{m} 40.89^{s}	−20° 22′ 54.6″	6.12	0.43	448	K1II	
247 G. Eri			247		29184	21363	04^{h} 35^{m} 00.65^{s}	−19° 55′ 17.5″	6.12	1.09	330	K2IIICN...	
45 G. Eri			45		18557	13883	02^{h} 58^{m} 47.31^{s}	−09° 46′ 35.3″	6.14	1.37	293	A2m	
14 Eri		14	77		20395	15244	03^{h} 16^{m} 35.77^{s}	−09° 09′ 16.9″	6.14	3.47	111	F5V	Astrometric binary
EK Eri			209	EK	27536	20263	04^{h} 20^{m} 38.64^{s}	−06° 14′ 45.6″	6.15	2.22	209	G8 IV-III	BY Draconis variable
281 G. Eri			281		31726	23060	04^{h} 57^{m} 44.69^{s}	−14° 13′ 54.8″	6.15	−1.27	994	B2V	
74 G. Eri			74		20319	15203	03^{h} 16^{m} 00.85^{s}	−05° 55′ 07.3″	6.17	−0.21	616	B9V	
Gliese 86			13		13445	10138	02^{h} 10^{m} 25.93^{s}	−50° 49′ 25.4″	6.17	5.98	36	K1V	has a white dwarf companion and a planet (b)
DL Eri			155	DL	24832	18455	03^{h} 56^{m} 37.90^{s}	−09° 45′ 03.1″	6.18	1.05	346	F1V	δ Sct variable
EX Eri			268	EX	30422	22192	04^{h} 46^{m} 25.75^{s}	−28° 05′ 15.0″	6.18	2.38	187	A2IV/V	δ Sct variable
113 G. Eri			113		22799	17057	03^{h} 39^{m} 25.42^{s}	−10° 26′ 13.3″	6.19	0.88	376	G5	
54 G. Eri			54		18894	14124	03^{h} 02^{m} 09.23^{s}	−06° 29′ 39.1″	6.20	3.64	106	G0IV-V	
86 G. Eri			86		21019	15776	03^{h} 23^{m} 17.70^{s}	−07° 47′ 36.8″	6.20	3.36	120	G2V	
133 G. Eri			133		23958	17734	03^{h} 47^{m} 49.60^{s}	−36° 06′ 21.0″	6.21	0.16	529	B8V	
147 G. Eri			147		24497	18173	03^{h} 53^{m} 12.93^{s}	−18° 26′ 04.0″	6.21	−0.44	698	K0/K1III+..	
112 G. Eri			112		22798	17086	03^{h} 39^{m} 38.35^{s}	−03° 23′ 34.2″	6.22	1.16	335	G5	
229 G. Eri			229		28625	20997	04^{h} 30^{m} 09.99^{s}	−13° 35′ 32.5″	6.22	0.61	432	K0III	
HR 1614			284		32147	23311	05^{h} 00^{m} 48.68^{s}	−05° 45′ 03.5″	6.22	6.49	29	K3V	
67 G. Eri			67		19887	14814	03^{h} 11^{m} 16.74^{s}	−16° 01′ 29.8″	6.25	0.16	539	K2III	
104 G. Eri			104		22243	16677	03^{h} 34^{m} 37.46^{s}	−09° 52′ 05.8″	6.25	0.24	518	A2V	
232 G. Eri			232		28763	21110	04^{h} 31^{m} 25.86^{s}	−13° 38′ 38.8″	6.25	0.81	400	A2/A3V	
172 G. Eri			172		25910	19121	04^{h} 05^{m} 56.49^{s}	−08° 51′ 21.9″	6.27	1.71	266	A3V	
272 G. Eri			272		30743	22439	04^{h} 49^{m} 42.32^{s}	−13° 46′ 09.3″	6.27	3.53	115	F3/F5V	
253 G. Eri			253		29435	21486	04^{h} 36^{m} 50.94^{s}	−30° 43′ 00.5″	6.28	0.87	394	Ap...	
59 G. Eri			59		19210	14355	03^{h} 05^{m} 11.26^{s}	−08° 16′ 27.5″	6.30	0.72	425	K0	
75 G. Eri			75		20356	15230	03^{h} 16^{m} 21.71^{s}	−05° 43′ 49.5″	6.30	−1.25	1055	K5	
HD 17943			33		17943	13421	02^{h} 52^{m} 50.67^{s}	−09° 26′ 28.8″	6.31	1.30	328	A7IV	
89 G. Eri			89		21473	16015	03^{h} 26^{m} 11.77^{s}	−41° 38′ 13.2″	6.33	0.67	441	A1V	
173 G. Eri			173		25944	19111	04^{h} 05^{m} 46.73^{s}	−20° 30′ 45.1″	6.34	1.44	311	G8/K0III	
248 G. Eri			248		29227	21428	04^{h} 36^{m} 01.67^{s}	−03° 36′ 41.8″	6.34	−0.80	874	B7III	
21 G. Eri			21		17098	12708	02^{h} 43^{m} 20.22^{s}	−40° 31′ 40.6″	6.35	0.22	548	B9V	
114 G. Eri			114		22905	17136	03^{h} 40^{m} 11.44^{s}	−15° 13′ 35.4″	6.35	−0.13	644	G8/K0III+..	
31 G. Eri			31		17864	13271	02^{h} 50^{m} 47.77^{s}	−39° 55′ 55.9″	6.36	1.36	325	A0V	
66 G. Eri			66		19850	14797	03^{h} 11^{m} 05.27^{s}	−13° 15′ 51.5″	6.36	−1.14	1032	F6III	
168 G. Eri			168		25700	18990	04^{h} 04^{m} 08.65^{s}	−16° 35′ 18.9″	6.36	0.65	453	K2/K3III/IV	
207 G. Eri			207		27490	20138	04^{h} 19^{m} 02.89^{s}	−33° 54′ 16.7″	6.36	1.04	379	A+...	
9 G. Eri			9		11965	9022	01^{h} 56^{m} 09.40^{s}	−49° 50′ 11.3″	6.37	−0.08	635	B8/B9V	
65 G. Eri			65		19826	14757	03^{h} 10^{m} 35.35^{s}	−23° 44′ 19.0″	6.37	1.74	274	K0III	
					24834	18428	03^{h} 56^{m} 27.66^{s}	−13° 35′ 51.1″	6.37	−4.09	4025	M1III	
246 G. Eri			246		29163	21324	04^{h} 34^{m} 38.13^{s}	−24° 02′ 26.0″	6.37	0.76	432	K1III	
218 G. Eri			218		27941	20467	04^{h} 23^{m} 07.76^{s}	−35° 32′ 41.4″	6.38	−0.68	840	K1III	
189 G. Eri			189		26625	19601	04^{h} 12^{m} 00.26^{s}	−17° 16′ 28.6″	6.41	1.30	343	K0III	
188 G. Eri			188		26575	19509	04^{h} 10^{m} 45.89^{s}	−35° 16′ 25.4″	6.43	−1.37	1185	K2IIIp...	
12 G. Eri			12		12894	9685	02^{h} 04^{m} 35.04^{s}	−54° 52′ 53.9″	6.45	3.08	154	F2V	
126 G. Eri			126		23508	17436	03^{h} 44^{m} 06.36^{s}	−40° 39′ 36.3″	6.45	1.61	303	K1III	
186 G. Eri			186		26584	19590	04^{h} 11^{m} 56.10^{s}	−08° 50′ 15.0″	6.45	0.37	535	G5	
GY Eri			190	GY	26739	19725	04^{h} 13^{m} 38.15^{s}	−01° 08′ 59.0″	6.45	−1.71	1399	B5IV	
213 G. Eri			213		27660	20360	04^{h} 21^{m} 37.51^{s}	−06° 17′ 02.9″	6.45	0.53	498	A0	
27 G. Eri			27		17438	13008	02^{h} 47^{m} 11.14^{s}	−22° 29′ 08.4″	6.47	3.56	125	F2V	
134 G. Eri			134		24098	17950	03^{h} 50^{m} 16.10^{s}	−01° 31′ 21.5″	6.47	3.20	147	F2	
166 G. Eri			166		25631	18926	04^{h} 03^{m} 24.75^{s}	−20° 08′ 37.7″	6.47	−0.87	956	B3V	
26 G. Eri			26		17390	12964	02^{h} 46^{m} 45.06^{s}	−21° 38′ 22.4″	6.48	3.21	147	F3IV/V	
105 G. Eri			105		22379	16779	03^{h} 35^{m} 57.25^{s}	−05° 07′ 29.8″	6.49	−0.40	780	K0	
117 G. Eri			117		23010	17214	03^{h} 41^{m} 13.75^{s}	−11° 48′ 09.0″	6.49	1.67	300	F2III	
55 Eri B		55		DW	30021	21986	04^{h} 43^{m} 35.10^{s}	−08° 47′ 46.0″	6.70	1.22	405	G8III	DW Eri; component of the 55 Eri system
HD 19467					19467	14501	04^{h} 26^{m} 26.32^{s}	−10° 33′ 03.0″	7.00		101	G3V	has a brown dwarf (B)
HD 28185					28185	20723	04^{h} 26^{m} 26.32^{s}	−10° 33′ 03.0″	7.81	4.82	128	G5	has a planet (b)
HIP 8541					11343	8541	01^{h} 50^{m} 06.0^{s}	−54° 27′ 54″	7.9		551	K2III	has two planets (Ab, Ac) and a red dwarf companion (B)
HD 18015					18015	13467	02^{h} 53^{m} 27.2^{s}	−08° 50′ 53″	7.9			G6IV	has a planet (b)
HD 18742					18742	13993	03^{h} 00^{m} 11^{s}	−20° 48′ 09″	7.97		440	G9IV	Ayeyarwady, has a planet (b)
HD 30856					30856	22491	04^{h} 50^{m} 18^{s}	−24° 22′ 08″	8.07		385	K0III	Mouhoun, has a planet (Ab) and a red dwarf companion (B)
HD 13808					13808	10301	02^{h} 12^{m} 43^{s}	−53° 44′ 38″	8.38		93	K2V	has two planets (b & c)
HD 25015					25015	18527	03^{h} 57^{m} 44.0^{s}	−20° 16′ 04″	8.90		122	K2V	has a planet (b)
40 Eri B	ο^{2}	40			26976		04^{h} 15^{m} 29.30^{s}	−07° 36′ 41.0″	9.50	11.01	16	DA VII	component of the 40 Eri system; white dwarf
WASP-99							02^{h} 39^{m} 35.0^{s}	−50° 00′ 29″	9.5			F8	has a transiting planet (b)
HIP 12961						12961	02^{h} 46^{m} 42.89^{s}	−23° 05′ 11.8″	9.7	7.8	78	M0	Koeia, has a planet (b)
WASP-79							04^{h} 25^{m} 29.0^{s}	−30° 36′ 02″	10.1		783	F3	Montuno, has a transiting planet (b)
WASP-117							02^{h} 27^{m} 06.0^{s}	−50° 17′ 04″	10.15			F9	has a transiting planet (b)
U Eri				U	24220		03^{h} 50^{m} 29.1^{s}	−24° 57′ 23″	10.40		6300	M4e	Mira variable
WASP-97							01^{h} 38^{m} 25.0^{s}	−55° 46′ 19″	10.6			G5	has a transiting planet (b)
WASP-35							05^{h} 04^{m} 19.63^{s}	−06° 13′ 47.4″	10.95		663	G0	has a transiting planet (b)
WASP-140							01^{h} 38^{m} 25.0^{s}	−55° 46′ 19″	11.1		587	K0	has a transiting planet (b)
WASP-50							02^{h} 54^{m} 45^{s}	−10° 53′ 53″	11.6		629	F	Chaophraya, has a transiting planet (b)
WASP-22							03^{h} 31^{m} 16.32^{s}	−23° 49′ 10.9″	11.99	4.68	942	G	Tojil, has a transiting planet (b)
WASP-78							04^{h} 15^{m} 02.0^{s}	−22° 06′ 59″	12.0		1794	F8	has a transiting planet (b)
WASP-139							03^{h} 18^{m} 15.0^{s}	−41° 18′ 08″	12.4		750	K0	has a transiting planet (b)
WASP-141							04^{h} 47^{m} 18.0^{s}	−17° 06′ 55″	12.4		1859	F9	has a transiting planet (b)
HATS-5							04^{h} 28^{m} 54.0^{s}	−20° 31′ 05″	12.63		838	F8	has a planet (b)
WASP-98							03^{h} 53^{m} 42.0^{s}	−34° 19′ 42″	13.0			G7	has a transiting planet (b)
EF Eri				EF			03^{h} 14^{m} 13.03^{s}	−22° 35′ 41.4″	13.7		523		AM Her variable; V_{max} = 14.5m V_{min} = <17.5; has an uncategorised substellar object in orbit, called EF Eridani B
Table legend: • Name = Proper name • B = Bayer designation • F or/and G. = Flamsteed designation or Gould designation • Var = Variable-star designation • HD = Henry Draper Catalogue designation number • HIP = Hipparcos Catalogue designation number • RA = Right ascension for the Epoch/Equinox J2000.0 • Dec = Declination for the Epoch/Equinox J2000.0 • vis. mag. = visual magnitude (m or m_{v}), also known as apparent magnitude • abs. mag. = absolute magnitude (M_{v}) • Dist. (ly) = Distance in light-years from Earth • Sp. class = Spectral class of the star in the stellar classification system • Notes = Common name(s) or alternate name(s); comments; notable properties [for example: multiple star status, range of variability if it is a variable star, exoplanets, etc.]

== See also ==
- List of stars by constellation
