= Eridanus in Chinese astronomy =

Constellation in Chinese astronomy

The modern constellation Eridanus lies across one of the quadrants symbolized by the White Tiger of the West (西方白虎, Xī Fāng Bái Hǔ), and The Southern Asterisms (近南極星區, Jìnnánjíxīng'ōu), that divide the sky in traditional Chinese uranography.

According to the quadrant, it is possible that the constellation Eridanus is not fully visible. Achernar (Alpha Eridani) is a bright star in this constellation that may have never been seen in Chinese skies.

The name of the western constellation in modern Chinese is 波江座 (bō jiāng zuò), meaning "the Po (river) constellation".

== Stars ==
The map of Chinese constellation in constellation Eridanus area consists of :

Four Symbols	Mansion (Chinese name)	Romanization	Translation	Asterisms (Chinese name)	Romanization	Translation	Western star name	Proper Name	Chinese star name	Romanization	Translation
White Tiger of the West (西方白虎)	胃	Wèi	Stomach	天囷	Tiānqūn	Circular Celestial Granary					
White Tiger of the West (西方白虎)	胃	Wèi	Stomach	天囷	Tiānqūn	Circular Celestial Granary	25 Eri		天囷增十三	Tiānqūnzēngshíyī	13th additional star
White Tiger of the West (西方白虎)	胃	Wèi	Stomach	天囷	Tiānqūn	Circular Celestial Granary	24 Eri		天囷增十四	Tiānqūnzēngshísì	14th additional star
White Tiger of the West (西方白虎)	胃	Wèi	Stomach	天囷	Tiānqūn	Circular Celestial Granary	7 Eri		天囷增十八	Tiānqūnzēngshíbā	18th additional star
White Tiger of the West (西方白虎)	胃	Wèi	Stomach	天囷	Tiānqūn	Circular Celestial Granary	5 Eri		天囷增十九	Tiānqūnzēngshíjiǔ	19th additional star
White Tiger of the West (西方白虎)	昴	Mǎo	Hairy Head	天苑	Tiānyuàn	Celestial Meadows					
White Tiger of the West (西方白虎)	昴	Mǎo	Hairy Head	天苑	Tiānyuàn	Celestial Meadows	γ Eri	Zaurak			
White Tiger of the West (西方白虎)	昴	Mǎo	Hairy Head	天苑	Tiānyuàn	Celestial Meadows	γ Eri	Zaurak	天苑一	Tiānyuànyī	1st star
White Tiger of the West (西方白虎)	昴	Mǎo	Hairy Head	天苑	Tiānyuàn	Celestial Meadows	γ Eri	Zaurak	天苑第—星	Tiānyuàndiyīxīng	1st star
White Tiger of the West (西方白虎)	昴	Mǎo	Hairy Head	天苑	Tiānyuàn	Celestial Meadows	π Eri		天苑二	Tiānyuànèr	2nd star
White Tiger of the West (西方白虎)	昴	Mǎo	Hairy Head	天苑	Tiānyuàn	Celestial Meadows	δ Eri	Rana	天苑三	Tiānyuànsān	3rd star
White Tiger of the West (西方白虎)	昴	Mǎo	Hairy Head	天苑	Tiānyuàn	Celestial Meadows	ε Eri	Ran	天苑四	Tiānyuànsì	4th star
White Tiger of the West (西方白虎)	昴	Mǎo	Hairy Head	天苑	Tiānyuàn	Celestial Meadows	ζ Eri	Zibal (for component Aa)	天苑五	Tiānyuànwu	5th star
White Tiger of the West (西方白虎)	昴	Mǎo	Hairy Head	天苑	Tiānyuàn	Celestial Meadows	η Eri	Azha	天苑六	Tiānyuànliù	6th star
White Tiger of the West (西方白虎)	昴	Mǎo	Hairy Head	天苑	Tiānyuàn	Celestial Meadows	τ^{1} Eri		天苑八	Tiānyuànbā	8th star
White Tiger of the West (西方白虎)	昴	Mǎo	Hairy Head	天苑	Tiānyuàn	Celestial Meadows	τ^{2} Eri	Angetenar	天苑九	Tiānyuànjiǔ	9th star
White Tiger of the West (西方白虎)	昴	Mǎo	Hairy Head	天苑	Tiānyuàn	Celestial Meadows	τ^{3} Eri		天苑十	Tiānyuànshí	10th star
White Tiger of the West (西方白虎)	昴	Mǎo	Hairy Head	天苑	Tiānyuàn	Celestial Meadows	τ^{4} Eri		天苑十一	Tiānyuànshíyī	11th star
White Tiger of the West (西方白虎)	昴	Mǎo	Hairy Head	天苑	Tiānyuàn	Celestial Meadows	τ^{5} Eri		天苑十二	Tiānyuànshíèr	12th star
White Tiger of the West (西方白虎)	昴	Mǎo	Hairy Head	天苑	Tiānyuàn	Celestial Meadows	τ^{6} Eri		天苑十三	Tiānyuànshísān	13th star
White Tiger of the West (西方白虎)	昴	Mǎo	Hairy Head	天苑	Tiānyuàn	Celestial Meadows	τ^{7} Eri		天苑十四	Tiānyuànshísì	14th star
White Tiger of the West (西方白虎)	昴	Mǎo	Hairy Head	天苑	Tiānyuàn	Celestial Meadows	τ^{8} Eri		天苑十五	Tiānyuànshíwǔ	15th star
White Tiger of the West (西方白虎)	昴	Mǎo	Hairy Head	天苑	Tiānyuàn	Celestial Meadows	τ^{9} Eri		天苑十六	Tiānyuànshíliù	16th star
White Tiger of the West (西方白虎)	昴	Mǎo	Hairy Head	天苑	Tiānyuàn	Celestial Meadows	20 Eri		天苑增一	Tiānyuànzēngyī	1st additional star
White Tiger of the West (西方白虎)	昴	Mǎo	Hairy Head	天苑	Tiānyuàn	Celestial Meadows	15 Eri		天苑增二	Tiānyuànzēngèr	2nd additional star
White Tiger of the West (西方白虎)	昴	Mǎo	Hairy Head	天苑	Tiānyuàn	Celestial Meadows	6 Eri		天苑增五	Tiānyuànzēngwǔ	5th additional star
White Tiger of the West (西方白虎)	昴	Mǎo	Hairy Head	天苑	Tiānyuàn	Celestial Meadows	4 Eri		天苑增六	Tiānyuànzēngliù	6th additional star
White Tiger of the West (西方白虎)	昴	Mǎo	Hairy Head	天苑	Tiānyuàn	Celestial Meadows	ρ^{1} Eri		天苑增十	Tiānyuànzēngshí	10th additional star
White Tiger of the West (西方白虎)	昴	Mǎo	Hairy Head	天苑	Tiānyuàn	Celestial Meadows	ρ^{2} Eri		天苑增十一	Tiānyuànzēngshíyī	11th additional star
White Tiger of the West (西方白虎)	昴	Mǎo	Hairy Head	天苑	Tiānyuàn	Celestial Meadows	ρ^{3} Eri		天苑增十二	Tiānyuànzēngshíèr	12th additional star
White Tiger of the West (西方白虎)	昴	Mǎo	Hairy Head	天苑	Tiānyuàn	Celestial Meadows	14 Eri		天苑增十三	Tiānyuànzēngshísān	13th additional star
White Tiger of the West (西方白虎)	昴	Mǎo	Hairy Head	天苑	Tiānyuàn	Celestial Meadows	17 Eri		天苑增十四	Tiānyuànzēngshísì	14th additional star
White Tiger of the West (西方白虎)	昴	Mǎo	Hairy Head	天苑	Tiānyuàn	Celestial Meadows	21 Eri		天苑增十五	Tiānyuànzēngshíwǔ	15th additional star
White Tiger of the West (西方白虎)	昴	Mǎo	Hairy Head	天苑	Tiānyuàn	Celestial Meadows	22 Eri		天苑增十六	Tiānyuànzēngshíliù	16th additional star
White Tiger of the West (西方白虎)	昴	Mǎo	Hairy Head	天苑	Tiānyuàn	Celestial Meadows	HD 22243		天苑增十八	Tiānyuànzēngshíbā	18th additional star
White Tiger of the West (西方白虎)	畢	Bì	Net	九州殊口	Jiǔzhōushūkǒu	Interpreters of Nine Dialects					
White Tiger of the West (西方白虎)	畢	Bì	Net	九州殊口	Jiǔzhōushūkǒu	Interpreters of Nine Dialects	39 Eri		九州殊口一	Jiǔzhōushūkǒuyī	1st star
White Tiger of the West (西方白虎)	畢	Bì	Net	九州殊口	Jiǔzhōushūkǒu	Interpreters of Nine Dialects	ο^{1} Eri	Beid	九州殊口二	Jiǔzhōushūkǒuèr	2nd star
White Tiger of the West (西方白虎)	畢	Bì	Net	九州殊口	Jiǔzhōushūkǒu	Interpreters of Nine Dialects	ξ Eri		九州殊口三	Jiǔzhōushūkǒusān	3rd star
White Tiger of the West (西方白虎)	畢	Bì	Net	九州殊口	Jiǔzhōushūkǒu	Interpreters of Nine Dialects	ν Eri		九州殊口四	Jiǔzhōushūkǒusì	4th star
White Tiger of the West (西方白虎)	畢	Bì	Net	九州殊口	Jiǔzhōushūkǒu	Interpreters of Nine Dialects	56 Eri		九州殊口五	Jiǔzhōushūkǒuwu	5th star
White Tiger of the West (西方白虎)	畢	Bì	Net	九州殊口	Jiǔzhōushūkǒu	Interpreters of Nine Dialects	55 Eri		九州殊口六	Jiǔzhōushūkǒuliù	6th star
White Tiger of the West (西方白虎)	畢	Bì	Net	九州殊口	Jiǔzhōushūkǒu	Interpreters of Nine Dialects	35 Eri		九州殊口增一	Jiǔzhōushūkǒuzēngyī	1st additional star
White Tiger of the West (西方白虎)	畢	Bì	Net	九州殊口	Jiǔzhōushūkǒu	Interpreters of Nine Dialects	32 Eri		九州殊口增二	Jiǔzhōushūkǒuzēngèr	2nd additional star
White Tiger of the West (西方白虎)	畢	Bì	Net	九州殊口	Jiǔzhōushūkǒu	Interpreters of Nine Dialects	29 Eri		九州殊口增三	Jiǔzhōushūkǒuzēngsān	3rd additional star
White Tiger of the West (西方白虎)	畢	Bì	Net	九州殊口	Jiǔzhōushūkǒu	Interpreters of Nine Dialects	30 Eri		九州殊口增四	Jiǔzhōushūkǒuzēngsì	4th additional star
White Tiger of the West (西方白虎)	畢	Bì	Net	九州殊口	Jiǔzhōushūkǒu	Interpreters of Nine Dialects	37 Eri		九州殊口增六	Jiǔzhōushūkǒuzēngliù	6th additional star
White Tiger of the West (西方白虎)	畢	Bì	Net	九州殊口	Jiǔzhōushūkǒu	Interpreters of Nine Dialects	ο^{2} Eri	Keid (for component A)	九州殊口增七	Jiǔzhōushūkǒuzēngqī	7th additional star
White Tiger of the West (西方白虎)	畢	Bì	Net	九州殊口	Jiǔzhōushūkǒu	Interpreters of Nine Dialects	47 Eri		九州殊口增八	Jiǔzhōushūkǒuzēngbā	8th additional star
White Tiger of the West (西方白虎)	畢	Bì	Net	九州殊口	Jiǔzhōushūkǒu	Interpreters of Nine Dialects	46 Eri		九州殊口增九	Jiǔzhōushūkǒuzēngjiǔ	9th additional star
White Tiger of the West (西方白虎)	畢	Bì	Net	九州殊口	Jiǔzhōushūkǒu	Interpreters of Nine Dialects	51 Eri		九州殊口增十	Jiǔzhōushūkǒuzēngshí	10th additional star
White Tiger of the West (西方白虎)	畢	Bì	Net	九斿	Jiǔliú	Imperial Military Flag					
White Tiger of the West (西方白虎)	畢	Bì	Net	九斿	Jiǔliú	Imperial Military Flag	μ Eri		九斿二	Jiǔliúèr	2nd star
White Tiger of the West (西方白虎)	畢	Bì	Net	九斿	Jiǔliú	Imperial Military Flag	ω Eri		九斿三	Jiǔliúsān	3rd star
White Tiger of the West (西方白虎)	畢	Bì	Net	九斿	Jiǔliú	Imperial Military Flag	63 Eri		九斿四	Jiǔliúsì	4th star
White Tiger of the West (西方白虎)	畢	Bì	Net	九斿	Jiǔliú	Imperial Military Flag	64 Eri		九斿五	Jiǔliúwu	5th star
White Tiger of the West (西方白虎)	畢	Bì	Net	九斿	Jiǔliú	Imperial Military Flag	60 Eri		九斿六	Jiǔliúliù	6th star
White Tiger of the West (西方白虎)	畢	Bì	Net	九斿	Jiǔliú	Imperial Military Flag	58 Eri		九斿七	Jiǔliúqī	7th star
White Tiger of the West (西方白虎)	畢	Bì	Net	九斿	Jiǔliú	Imperial Military Flag	54 Eri		九斿八	Jiǔliúbā	8th star
White Tiger of the West (西方白虎)	畢	Bì	Net	九斿	Jiǔliú	Imperial Military Flag	45 Eri		九斿增二	Jiǔliúzēngèr	2nd additional star
White Tiger of the West (西方白虎)	畢	Bì	Net	九斿	Jiǔliú	Imperial Military Flag	62 Eri		九斿增三	Jiǔliúzēngsān	3rd additional star
White Tiger of the West (西方白虎)	畢	Bì	Net	九斿	Jiǔliú	Imperial Military Flag	53 Eri	Sceptrum (for component A)	九斿增四	Jiǔliúzēngsì	4th additional star
White Tiger of the West (西方白虎)	畢	Bì	Net	九斿	Jiǔliú	Imperial Military Flag	59 Eri		九斿增五	Jiǔliúzēngwǔ	5th additional star
White Tiger of the West (西方白虎)	畢	Bì	Net	九斿	Jiǔliú	Imperial Military Flag	HD 29613		九斿增六	Jiǔliúzēngliù	6th additional star
White Tiger of the West (西方白虎)	畢	Bì	Net	天園	Tiānyuán	Celestial Orchard					
White Tiger of the West (西方白虎)	畢	Bì	Net	天園	Tiānyuán	Celestial Orchard	χ Eri		天園二	Tiānyuánèr	2nd star
White Tiger of the West (西方白虎)	畢	Bì	Net	天園	Tiānyuán	Celestial Orchard	φ Eri		天園三	Tiānyuánsān	3rd star
White Tiger of the West (西方白虎)	畢	Bì	Net	天園	Tiānyuán	Celestial Orchard	κ Eri		天園四	Tiānyuánsì	4th star
White Tiger of the West (西方白虎)	畢	Bì	Net	天園	Tiānyuán	Celestial Orchard	s Eri		天園五	Tiānyuánwu	5th star
White Tiger of the West (西方白虎)	畢	Bì	Net	天園	Tiānyuán	Celestial Orchard	θ^{1} Eri	Acamar (for primary component)	天園六	Tiānyuánliù	6th star
White Tiger of the West (西方白虎)	畢	Bì	Net	天園	Tiānyuán	Celestial Orchard	h Eri		天園七	Tiānyuánqī	7th star
White Tiger of the West (西方白虎)	畢	Bì	Net	天園	Tiānyuán	Celestial Orchard	f Eri		天園八	Tiānyuánbā	8th star
White Tiger of the West (西方白虎)	畢	Bì	Net	天園	Tiānyuán	Celestial Orchard	g Eri		天園九	Tiānyuánjiǔ	9th star
White Tiger of the West (西方白虎)	畢	Bì	Net	天園	Tiānyuán	Celestial Orchard	υ^{4} Eri		天園十	Tiānyuánshí	10th star
White Tiger of the West (西方白虎)	畢	Bì	Net	天園	Tiānyuán	Celestial Orchard	υ^{3} Eri	Beemim	天園十一	Tiānyuánshíyī	11th star
White Tiger of the West (西方白虎)	畢	Bì	Net	天園	Tiānyuán	Celestial Orchard	υ^{2} Eri	Theemin	天園十二	Tiānyuánshíèr	12th star
White Tiger of the West (西方白虎)	畢	Bì	Net	天園	Tiānyuán	Celestial Orchard	υ^{1} Eri				
White Tiger of the West (西方白虎)	畢	Bì	Net	天園	Tiānyuán	Celestial Orchard	υ^{1} Eri		天園十三	Tiānyuánshísān	13th star
White Tiger of the West (西方白虎)	畢	Bì	Net	天園	Tiānyuán	Celestial Orchard	υ^{1} Eri		天大将军南大星	Tiānyuánjiāngjūnnándàxīng	Star of southern general in the celestial orchard
White Tiger of the West (西方白虎)	畢	Bì	Net	天園	Tiānyuán	Celestial Orchard	ι Eri		天園增一	Tiānyuánzēngyī	1st additional star
White Tiger of the West (西方白虎)	畢	Bì	Net	天園	Tiānyuán	Celestial Orchard	e Eri		天園增三	Tiānyuánzēngsān	3rd additional star
White Tiger of the West (西方白虎)	畢	Bì	Net	天園	Tiānyuán	Celestial Orchard	y Eri		天園增四	Tiānyuánzēngsì	4th additional star
White Tiger of the West (西方白虎)	畢	Bì	Net	天園	Tiānyuán	Celestial Orchard	i Eri		天園增五	Tiānyuánzēngwǔ	5th additional star
White Tiger of the West (西方白虎)	參	Shēn	Three Stars	玉井	Yùjǐng	Jade Well					
White Tiger of the West (西方白虎)	參	Shēn	Three Stars	玉井	Yùjǐng	Jade Well	λ Eri		玉井一	Yùjǐngyī	1st star
White Tiger of the West (西方白虎)	參	Shēn	Three Stars	玉井	Yùjǐng	Jade Well	ψ Eri		玉井二	Yùjǐngèr	2nd star
White Tiger of the West (西方白虎)	參	Shēn	Three Stars	玉井	Yùjǐng	Jade Well	β Eri	Cursa			
White Tiger of the West (西方白虎)	參	Shēn	Three Stars	玉井	Yùjǐng	Jade Well	β Eri	Cursa	玉井三	Yùjǐngsān	3rd star
White Tiger of the West (西方白虎)	參	Shēn	Three Stars	玉井	Yùjǐng	Jade Well	β Eri	Cursa	玉井西北星	Yùjǐngxīběixīng	Northwestern star
White Tiger of the West (西方白虎)	參	Shēn	Three Stars	玉井	Yùjǐng	Jade Well	66 Eri		玉井增增一	Yùjǐngzēngyī	1st additional star
White Tiger of the West (西方白虎)	參	Shēn	Three Stars	玉井	Yùjǐng	Jade Well	68 Eri		玉井增二	Yùjǐngzēngèr	2nd additional star
White Tiger of the West (西方白虎)	參	Shēn	Three Stars	玉井	Yùjǐng	Jade Well	HD 32994		玉井增三	Yùjǐngzēngsān	3rd additional star
-	近南極星區 (non-mansions)	Jìnnánjíxīngōu (non-mansions)	The Southern Asterisms (non-mansions)	水委	Shuǐwěi	Crooked Running Water					
-	近南極星區 (non-mansions)	Jìnnánjíxīngōu (non-mansions)	The Southern Asterisms (non-mansions)	水委	Shuǐwěi	Crooked Running Water	α Eri	Achernar			
-	近南極星區 (non-mansions)	Jìnnánjíxīngōu (non-mansions)	The Southern Asterisms (non-mansions)	水委	Shuǐwěi	Crooked Running Water	α Eri	Achernar	水委一	Shuǐwěiyī	1st star
-	近南極星區 (non-mansions)	Jìnnánjíxīngōu (non-mansions)	The Southern Asterisms (non-mansions)	水委	Shuǐwěi	Crooked Running Water	α Eri	Achernar	外屏西星	Wàibīngxīxīng	Separated and hidden star in the west

== See also ==
- Traditional Chinese star names
- Chinese constellations
- List of brightest stars
