= Upsilon Eridani =

Four or seven stars in the constellation Eridanus

Location of υ Eridani stars (circled)

The Bayer designation Upsilon Eridani (υ Eri / υ Eridani) is shared by four or seven stars, in the constellation Eridanus:

- υ^{1} Eridani (50 Eridani)
- υ^{2} Eridani (52 Eridani)
- υ^{3} Eridani (43 Eridani)
- υ^{4} Eridani (41 Eridani)

Some sources include the following stars:

- υ^{5} Eridani (f Eridani)
- υ^{6} Eridani (g Eridani)
- υ^{7} Eridani (h Eridani)

This series of stars bore the traditional proper names Theemim (also Theemin) and Beemin (also Beemim). In 2016, the International Astronomical Union organized a Working Group on Star Names (WGSN) to catalog and standardize proper names for stars. The WGSN approved the names Theemin for υ^{2} Eridani on 1 February 2017 and Beemim for υ^{3} Eridani on 30 June 2017; both are now included in the List of IAU-approved Star Names.
