= Theta Eridani =

Star system in the constellation Eridanus

- Location of θ Eridani (circled)

Observation data Epoch J2000 Equinox ICRS
- Constellation: Eridanus
- θ^{1} Eri
- Right ascension: 02^{h} 58^{m} 15.6764^{s}
- Declination: −40° 18′ 16.839″
- Apparent magnitude (V): 3.18
- θ^{2} Eri
- Right ascension: 02^{h} 58^{m} 16.4037^{s}
- Declination: −40° 18′ 16.906″
- Apparent magnitude (V): 4.11

Characteristics

θ^{1} Eri
- Evolutionary stage: Subgiant + main sequence
- Spectral type: A3IV-V
- U−B color index: +0.14
- B−V color index: +0.128±0.012
- Variable type: Rotating ellipsoidal variable

θ^{2} Eri
- Evolutionary stage: Main sequence
- Spectral type: A1V
- B−V color index: +0.08
- Variable type: suspected

Astrometry

θ^{1} Eri
Radial velocity (R_{v})	+10.6±0.7 km/s
Proper motion (μ)	RA: −52.273 mas/yr Dec.: +23.058 mas/yr
Parallax (π)	19.9047±0.2062 mas
Distance	167±1 ly (51.2±0.3 pc)

θ^{2} Eri
Radial velocity (R_{v})	+7.57±0.33 km/s
Proper motion (μ)	RA: −50.502 mas/yr Dec.: +16.613 mas/yr
Parallax (π)	19.5270±0.1372 mas
Distance	167±1 ly (51.2±0.3 pc)
Absolute magnitude (M_{V})	−0.59 (combined)

Orbit
Primary	θ^{1} Eri A
Secondary	θ^{1} Eri B
Period (P)	4.107704±0.000008 days
Semi-major axis (a)	(1.62±0.03)×10^{−3}" (0.083±0.002 au)
Eccentricity (e)	0.105±0.010
Inclination (i)	43.2±2.3°
Longitude of the node (Ω)	30.7±1.4°
Periastron epoch (T)	2,457,949.89±0.06 JD
Argument of periastron (ω) (secondary)	332.2±5.4°
Semi-amplitude (K_{1}) (primary)	77.0±1.4 km/s
Semi-amplitude (K_{2}) (secondary)	81.9±0.4 km/s

Details

θ^{1} Eri A
Mass	2.33±0.13 M_{☉}
Radius	4.3±0.1 R_{☉}
Luminosity	56 L_{☉}
Surface gravity (log g)	3.54 cgs
Temperature	7,600 K
Rotational velocity (v sin i)	70 km/s
Age	725 Myr

θ^{1} Eri B
Mass	2.19±0.13 M_{☉}
Radius	3.95±0.10 R_{☉}
Luminosity	52 L_{☉}
Surface gravity (log g)	3.57 cgs
Temperature	7,800 K
Rotational velocity (v sin i)	60 km/s
Age	725 Myr

θ^{2} Eri
Mass	2.30 M_{☉}
Radius	3.2 R_{☉}
Luminosity	44 L_{☉}
Surface gravity (log g)	4.0 cgs
Temperature	8,300 K
Metallicity [Fe/H]	−0.197 dex
Rotational velocity (v sin i)	102.5 km/s
Age	630 Myr

Other designations
- Theta Eri, θ Eri, CD−40°771, HIP 13847, SAO 216113, CCDM J02583-4018, WDS 02583-4018
- θ^{1} Eri: Acamar, HD 18622, HR 897
- θ^{2} Eri: HD 18623, HR 898

Database references
SIMBAD	The system
- θ^{1} Eri
- θ^{2} Eri

Theta Eridani, Latinized from θ Eridani, is a triple star system in the constellation of Eridanus, with a combined apparent magnitude of 2.88. The primary component has the proper name Acamar /ˈækəmɑːr/, the traditional name of the system. The system's distance based on parallax measurements is 51.2 ± 0.3 parsecs (166.99 ± 0.98 light-years).

== Stellar system ==
θ Eridani is a visual binary formed by the components θ^{1} Eridani and θ^{2} Eridani, alternatively called θ Eridani A and θ Eridani B, respectively. They have individual apparent magnitudes of +3.18 and +4.11, spectral classes of A3IV-V and A1V, and are separated by 8.3" in the sky, corresponding to a projected separation of 425 astronomical units (au).

θ^{1} is itself a double-lined spectroscopic binary, bringing the number of known stars to three. Its components take 4.107704 days to complete an orbit, with a semi-major axis of 0.083 au (12,400,000 km; 18 R_{☉}) and an eccentricity of 0.105. They are so close to each other that their shapes are distorted by tidal forces, and during the orbit the surfaces visible from Earth, and hence the luminosities, vary, making the system a rotating ellipsoidal variable. The primary, θ^{1} A, has already exhausted the hydrogen at its core and is in the subgiant phase, with 2.33 times the mass and 4.3 times the radius of the Sun. The secondary, θ^{1} B, is still approaching the end of the main sequence, with 2.19 times the mass and 3.95 times the Sun's radius. Their effective temperatures are 7,600 and 7,800 K respectively, giving them a white color typical of A-type stars. As θ^{1} A evolves and becomes larger than its Roche lobe, mass exchange between the components is expected to occur within a few tens of millions of years.

The spectroscopic binary nature of θ^{1} was initially uncovered by W. H. Wright in 1905. In 2025, the system was resolved directly using interferometry by the GRAVITY instrument aboard the Very Large Telescope. Additional data led to a full orbital solution in 2026.

θ^{2} Eridani is also near the end of its main sequence lifetime, having an estimated age of 630 million years, 2.3 times the mass and 3.2 times the Sun's radius. It has an effective temperature of 8,300 K, giving a white color typical of A-type stars. It appears to be a single star itself, and interferometric observations constrain the mass of any main sequence companion between 0.001″–0.2″ to be less than 0.55 solar masses.

In the ancient era, Theta Eridani was among the thirteenth brightest stars in the sky, as indicated by Ptolemy in his book Almagest (137 AD) and al-Sufi in his The Book of Fixed Stars (964 AD), as well as possibly being noted by Hipparchus (129 BC). This could be explained as an millennium-long outburst in the θ^{1} system, powered by extraction of orbital energy during a common envelope phase, and resulted the result of mass transfer from the primary, which overflew its Roche lobe, to the secondary.

== Nomenclature ==
Theta Eridani, Latinized from θ Eridani, is the system's Bayer designation; θ^{1} and θ^{2} Eridani those of its two components.

The system bore the traditional name Acamar, derived from the Arabic آخِر النَّهْر Ākhir an-nahr, which means "the end of the river", via a Roman-alphabet handwriting misread "rn" to "m". In 2016, the International Astronomical Union organized a Working Group on Star Names (WGSN) to catalog and standardize proper names for stars. The WGSN decided to attribute proper names to individual stars rather than entire multiple systems. It approved the name "Acamar" for θ^{1} Eridani on 20 July 2016 and it is now so entered in the IAU Catalog of Star Names.

The term "Ākhir an-nahr", or "Achr al Nahr", appeared in the catalogue of stars in the Calendarium of Al Achsasi Al Mouakket, which was translated into Latin as Postrema Fluminis.

Historically, Acamar represented the end of the constellation Eridanus. Now that distinction is held by the star Achernar, which shares the same Arabic etymology. Achernar is not visible from the Greek isles (latitudes > 33° North), hence the choice of Acamar as the river's end during the time of Hipparchus and, later, Ptolemy.

In Chinese, 天園 (Tiān Yuán), meaning Celestial Orchard, refers to an asterism consisting of Theta Eridani, Chi Eridani, Phi Eridani, Kappa Eridani, HD 16754, HD 23319, HD 24072, HD 24160, Upsilon^{4} Eridani, Upsilon^{3} Eridani, Upsilon^{2} Eridani and Upsilon^{1} Eridani. Consequently, the Chinese name for Theta Eridani itself is 天園六 (Tiān Yuán liù, English: the Sixth Star of Celestial Orchard).
