= Upsilon2 Eridani =

Star in the constellation of Eridanus

υ^{2} Eridani
- Location of υ^{2} Eridani (circled)

Observation data Epoch J2000.0 Equinox J2000.0 (ICRS)
- Constellation: Eridanus
- Right ascension: 04^{h} 35^{m} 33.03796^{s}
- Declination: −30° 33′ 44.4313″
- Apparent magnitude (V): 3.804

Characteristics
- Evolutionary stage: Red clump
- Spectral type: G8+ III
- U−B color index: +0.740
- B−V color index: +0.968

Astrometry
Radial velocity (R_{v})	−4.0±0.9 km/s
Proper motion (μ)	RA: −49.422 mas/yr Dec.: −12.543 mas/yr
Parallax (π)	15.4501±0.1081 mas
Distance	211 ± 1 ly (64.7 ± 0.5 pc)
Absolute magnitude (M_{V})	−0.139±0.033

Details
Mass	3.15±0.13 M_{☉}
Radius	14.09±0.34 R_{☉}
Luminosity	114±4 L_{☉}
Surface gravity (log g)	2.570±0.084 cgs
Temperature	5,023±42 K
Metallicity [Fe/H]	0.018±0.037 dex

Other designations
- Theemin, υ^{2} Eridani, Upsilon^{2} Eridani, 52 Eridani, CD−30°1901, CPD−30°631, FK5 170, GC 5614, HD 29291, HIP 21393, HR 1464, PPM 280424, SAO 195148

Database references
SIMBAD	data

Upsilon^{2} Eridani (υ² Eridani, abbreviated Upsilon^{2} Eri, υ^{2} Eri), officially named Theemin /ˈθiːmən/, is a star in the constellation of Eridanus. It is visible to the naked eye with an apparent visual magnitude of 3.8. Based upon parallax measurements obtained during the Gaia mission, it is approximately 211 light-years distant.

It is an evolved red clump giant star with a stellar classification of G8+ III. The star has 3.15 times the Sun's mass and 14.09 times the Sun's radius. It radiates 114 times the solar luminosity from its outer atmosphere at an effective temperature of 5,023 K.

== Nomenclature ==
υ^{2} Eridani (Latinised to Upsilon^{2} Eridani) is the star's Bayer designation.

It bore the traditional name Theemin (also written as Theemim and Beemin). In 2016, the International Astronomical Union organized a Working Group on Star Names (WGSN) to catalogue and standardize proper names for stars. The WGSN approved the name Theemin for this star on February 1, 2017, and it is now included in the List of IAU-approved Star Names.

In the Almagest, Ptolemy called it hē kampē, "the bend in the river;" Arab writers corrupted this to bhmn, later becoming beemin, beemun in the West. Subsequently, its etymology was incorrectly derived from Hebrew תאומים (te'omim), meaning "twins," producing Theemin.

In Chinese, 天園 (Tiān Yuán), meaning Celestial Orchard, refers to an asterism consisting of Upsilon^{2} Eridani, Chi Eridani, Phi Eridani, Kappa Eridani, HD 16754, HD 23319, Theta Eridani, HD 24072, HD 24160, Upsilon^{4} Eridani, Upsilon^{3} Eridani and Upsilon^{1} Eridani. Consequently, the Chinese name for Upsilon^{2} Eridani itself is 天園十二 (Tiān Yuán shíèr, English: the Twelfth Star of Celestial Orchard).
