= Upsilon3 Eridani =

Star in the constellation Eridanus

υ^{3} Eridani
- Location of υ^{3} Eridani (circled in red)

Observation data Epoch J2000.0 Equinox J2000.0 (ICRS)
- Constellation: Eridanus
- Right ascension: 04^{h} 24^{m} 02.21725^{s}
- Declination: −34° 01′ 00.6542″
- Apparent magnitude (V): 3.96

Characteristics
- Spectral type: K4 III
- U−B color index: +1.80
- B−V color index: +1.49

Astrometry
Radial velocity (R_{v})	+24.1±0.7 km/s
Proper motion (μ)	RA: +73.77 mas/yr Dec.: +56.70 mas/yr
Parallax (π)	11.01±0.37 mas
Distance	296 ± 10 ly (91 ± 3 pc)
Absolute magnitude (M_{V})	−0.82

Details
Radius	54 R_{☉}
Luminosity	426 L_{☉}
Surface gravity (log g)	1.71 cgs
Temperature	3,990 K
Metallicity [Fe/H]	−0.23 dex

Other designations
- Beemim, υ^{3} Eri, d Eri, 43 Eridani, CD−34°1664, FK5 1121, HD 28028, HIP 20535, HR 1393, SAO 194984

Database references
SIMBAD	data

Upsilon^{3} Eridani (υ^{3} Eridani, abbreviated Upsilon^{3} Eri, υ^{3} Eri), officially named Beemim /ˈbiːməm/, is a star in the constellation of Eridanus. It is visible to the naked eye with an apparent visual magnitude of 3.96 The distance to this star, based upon an annual parallax shift of 11.01 mas, is around 296 light-years.

This is an evolved K-type giant star with a stellar classification of K4 III. It has about 54 times the radius of the Sun and radiates 426 times the solar luminosity from its outer atmosphere at an effective temperature of 3,990 K.

== Nomenclature ==
υ^{3} Eridani (Latinised to Upsilon^{3} Eridani) is the star's Bayer designation.

This star bore the traditional name Beemim (also rendered Beemin, Theemim and Theemin—see Theemin). In 2016, the International Astronomical Union organized a Working Group on Star Names (WGSN) to catalog and standardize proper names for stars. The WGSN approved the name Beemim for this star on 30 June 2017 and it is now so included in the List of IAU-approved Star Names.

In Chinese, 天園 (Tiān Yuán), meaning Celestial Orchard, refers to an asterism consisting of Upsilon^{3} Eridani, Chi Eridani, Phi Eridani, Kappa Eridani, HD 16754, HD 23319, Theta Eridani, HD 24072, HD 24160, Upsilon^{4} Eridani, Upsilon^{2} Eridani and Upsilon^{1} Eridani. Consequently, the Chinese name for Upsilon^{3} Eridani itself is 天園十一 (Tiān Yuán shíyī, English: the Eleventh Star of Celestial Orchard).
