= K Eridani =

Locations of the k and K Eridani stars

The Bayer designations k Eridani and K Eridani are distinct.

The designation k Eridani is sometimes used by the star τ^{9} Eridani. Johann Bode used the designation for three stars instead, two of them now in Taurus:

- k^{1} Eridani (44 Eri)
- k^{2} Eridani (45 Eri)
- k^{3} Eridani (HD 29335)

The three stars designated K Eridani are all currently in Fornax:

- K^{1} Eridani (ψ For)
- K^{2} Eridani (HD 18377)
- K^{3} Eridani (HD 18546)

All of these designations are currently disused.
