= V Eridani =

The Bayer designation v Eridani and the variable star designation V Eridani are distinct. Due to technical limitations, both designations link here. For the star

- V Eridani, HD 25725, a semiregular variable star in the asymptotic giant branch
- v Eridani, 17 Eridani

== See also ==
- ν Eridani
