= U Eridani =

The Bayer designation u Eridani and the variable star designation U Eridani are distinct. Due to technical limitations, both designations link here. For the star

- U Eridani, HD 24220, a Mira variable
- u Eridani, HD 20121
