= D Eridani =

Star in the constellation Eridanus

d Eridani
- Location of d Eri (circled)

Observation data Epoch J2000 Equinox ICRS
- Constellation: Eridanus
- Right ascension: 04^{h} 20^{m} 42.8341^{s}
- Declination: −07° 35′ 32.986″
- Apparent magnitude (V): 5.84

Characteristics
- Spectral type: B5III or B7II
- Apparent magnitude (U): 5.23
- Apparent magnitude (B): 5.710
- Apparent magnitude (G): 5.829944
- Apparent magnitude (J): 6.026
- Apparent magnitude (H): 6.109
- Apparent magnitude (K): 6.113
- Variable type: SPB

Astrometry
Radial velocity (R_{v})	11.20±4.3 km/s
Proper motion (μ)	RA: 3.540 mas/yr Dec.: −2.298 mas/yr
Parallax (π)	3.7763±0.0612 mas
Distance	860 ± 10 ly (265 ± 4 pc)
Absolute magnitude (M_{V})	−1.05

Details
Mass	4.3 M_{☉}
Radius	2.8 R_{☉}
Luminosity	687 L_{☉}
Surface gravity (log g)	3.69 cgs
Temperature	13,315 K
Rotational velocity (v sin i)	34 km/s
Age	180 Myr

Other designations
- d Eri, 210 G. Eri, EM Eri, HR 1363, HD 27563, HIP 20271, BD−07 798, TIC 37777866, 2MASS J04204283−0735329

Database references
SIMBAD	data

d Eridani, also known as HD 27563, is a single star in Eridanus, in the direction of the Orion–Eridanus Superbubble, that is faintly visible to the naked eye at a magnitude of about 5.84. Cowley (1972) classifies this star as spectral type B5III, but Houk and Swift (1999) catalog it as B7II.

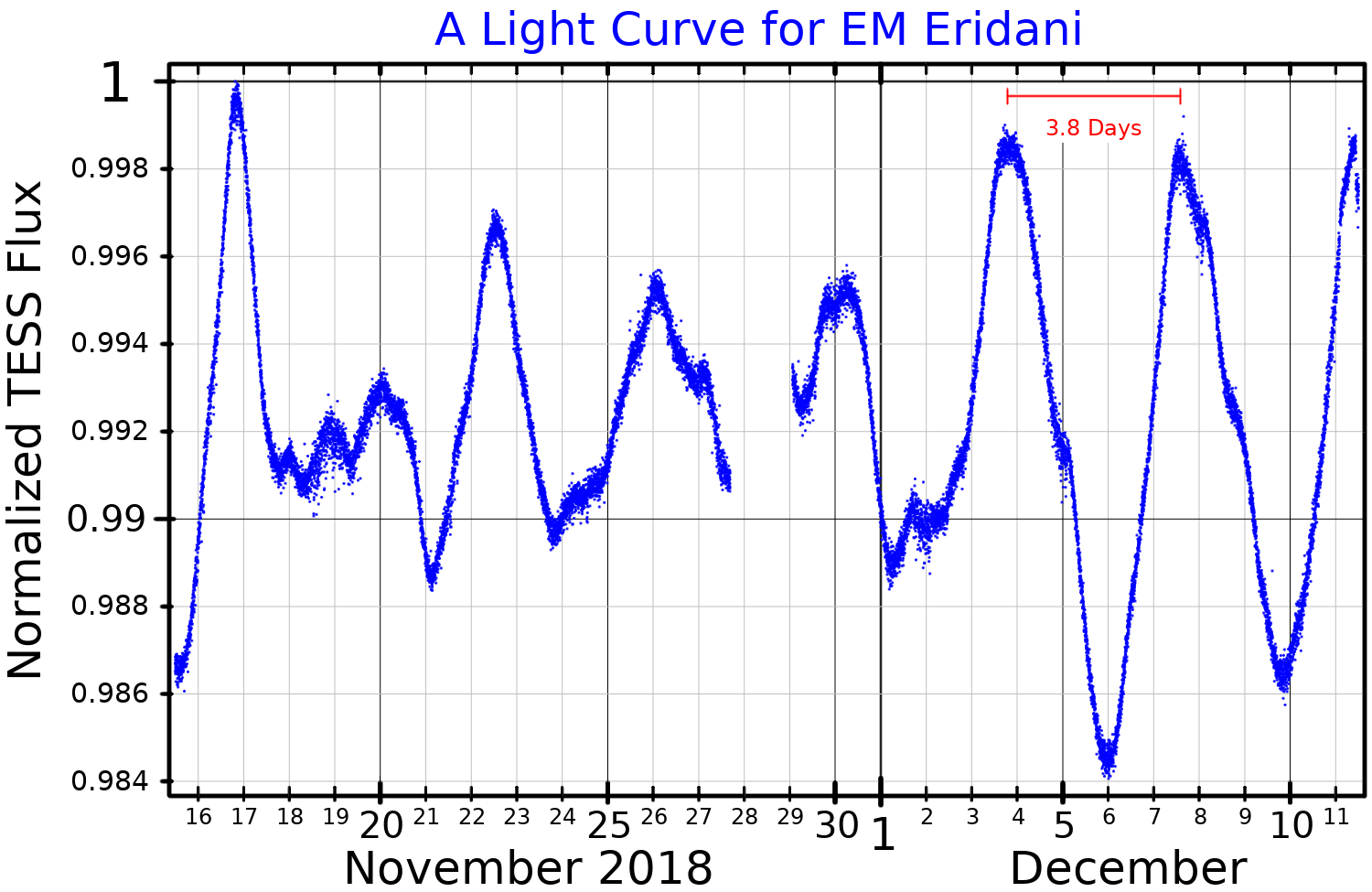
A light curve for EM Eridani, plotted from TESS data. The 3.8 day period is marked in red.

It was used as a comparison star for 46 Eridani in four separate runs at La Silla Observatory in the 1970s and 1980s, but in 1989, both stars were found to be variable with similar periods of about four days, and d Eridani was assigned the designation EM Eridani. Despite the lack of reliable comparisons for EM Eridani, it was found that the power spectrum of its light curve is remarkably noisy, with two or four prominent oscillation periods centered around 3.9215 d, and is classified as a slowly pulsating B-type star.
