= HD 11343 =

K-type giant star in the constellation Eridanus

- Location of HD 11343 (circled)

Observation data Epoch J2000.0 Equinox ICRS
- Constellation: Eridanus
- Right ascension: 01^{h} 50^{m} 06.33044^{s}
- Declination: −54° 27′ 53.8624″
- Apparent magnitude (V): 7.88

Characteristics
- Evolutionary stage: Red giant branch
- Spectral type: K2III/IV
- B−V color index: 1.10
- J−H color index: 0.556
- J−K color index: 0.722

Astrometry
Radial velocity (R_{v})	+6.92±0.12 km/s
Proper motion (μ)	RA: 110.617 mas/yr Dec.: −46.798 mas/yr
Parallax (π)	6.4964±0.0156 mas
Distance	502 ± 1 ly (153.9 ± 0.4 pc)
Absolute magnitude (M_{V})	+1.77

Orbit
Primary	HD 11343 A
Secondary	HD 11343 B
Semi-major axis (a)	~2600 AU

Details

HD 11343 A
Mass	1.17±0.28 / 2.009±0.115 M_{☉}
Radius	7.83±1.02 R_{☉}
Luminosity	25.1+5.8 −5.6 L_{☉}
Surface gravity (log g)	2.70±0.20 cgs
Temperature	4,670±100 K
Metallicity [Fe/H]	−0.15±0.08 dex
Rotational velocity (v sin i)	1.3±0.9 km/s

HD 11343 B
Mass	0.680+0.078 −0.083 M_{☉}
Radius	0.698+0.062 −0.060 R_{☉}
Luminosity	0.157 L_{☉}
Surface gravity (log g)	4.58+0.11 −0.09 cgs
Temperature	4,351+142 −113 K

Other designations
- CD−55 412, CPD−55 351, GC 2232, HD 11343, HIP 8541, SAO 232538, PPM 331373, TIC 231019255, TYC 8482-1124-1, GSC 08482-01124, 2MASS J01500631-5427539, Gaia DR3 4912062772547406976

Database references
SIMBAD	data

HD 11343 (HIP 8541) is a wide binary system between HD 11343 A, a K-type borderline giant star, and HD 11343 B, a red dwarf companion, located in the southern constellation of Eridanus about 500 light-years (150 pc) distant. Two gas giant exoplanets are known to orbit the primary star.

== Stellar characteristics ==
The HD 11343 system has an apparent magnitude of 7.88, making it too faint to be visible by the naked eye from Earth under most circumstances, but can be observed using binoculars as an orangish dot near Achernar.

The primary component, HD 11343 A, is a red-giant branch star slightly more massive than the Sun (albeit one estimate places its mass at a significantly higher 2.0 M_{☉}), but approximately eight times as large in radius and 25 times as luminous. It has an effective temperature of 4,670 K (4,400 °C; 7,950 °F), corresponding to its spectral type of K2, and is slightly metal-poor, with an iron content 71% that of the Sun.

During a 2021 survey searching for binaries within data from Gaia DR3, the star was found to be orbited by a 13th-magnitude M-dwarf, designated HD 11343 B. It is about 70% as large as the Sun both in mass and radius, is slightly cooler than the primary red giant at 4,351 K (4,078 °C; 7,372 °F), and is situated at a separation of roughly 2,600 astronomical units (0.041 ly) from its brighter companion.

== Planetary system ==
In 2016, a super-Jupiter planet orbiting HD 11343 A was discovered from radial-velocity observations, alongside three other substellar companions to giant stars, namely HIP 74890 b, HIP 84056 b, and HIP 95124 b. This planet, HD 11343 b, is estimated to be slightly larger than Jupiter and has a mass of 5.7 M_{J}, close to the initially estimated minimum of 5.5 M_{J}. It revolves around its host star at a semi-major axis of 2.8 AU (420,000,000 km), around where the asteroid belt would lie in the Solar System, every 1,585 days (4.34 years) in a mildly eccentric orbit.

Another planet, HD 11343 c, was discovered in 2022 closer to HD 11343 A, also using the radial-velocity method. The planet is reportedly a Jupiter analog, larger than the previous planet but likely considerably less massive, with a minimum mass of 0.804 M_{J}. It orbits its star at a distance of 0.923 AU (138,100,000 km) every 228.5 days (0.626 years). Due to the faintness of the astrometric signals it produces, its orbital inclination cannot be well-constrained. The discovery paper for HD 11343 c notably presents a higher mass (7.71+0.73
−1.19 M_{J}), semi-major axis (3.729 AU), orbital period (5.07 years), and eccentricity (0.360) for HD 11343 b.

The HD 11343 A planetary system
Companion (in order from star)	Mass	Semimajor axis (AU)	Orbital period (days)	Eccentricity	Inclination (°)	Radius
c	≥0.804 M_{J}	0.923 ^{+0.019}_{−0.022}	228.5 ^{+3.3}_{−3.8}	0.169 ^{+0.142}_{−0.102}	—	~1.24 R_{J}
b	5.7 ^{+1.2}_{−1.1} M_{J}	2.80 ^{+0.21}_{−0.25}	1585 ^{+27}_{−40}	0.122 ^{+0.060}_{−0.067}	73.0 ^{+12.0}_{−16.0}	~1.13 R_{J}
