= EK Eridani =

Star in the constellation Eridanus

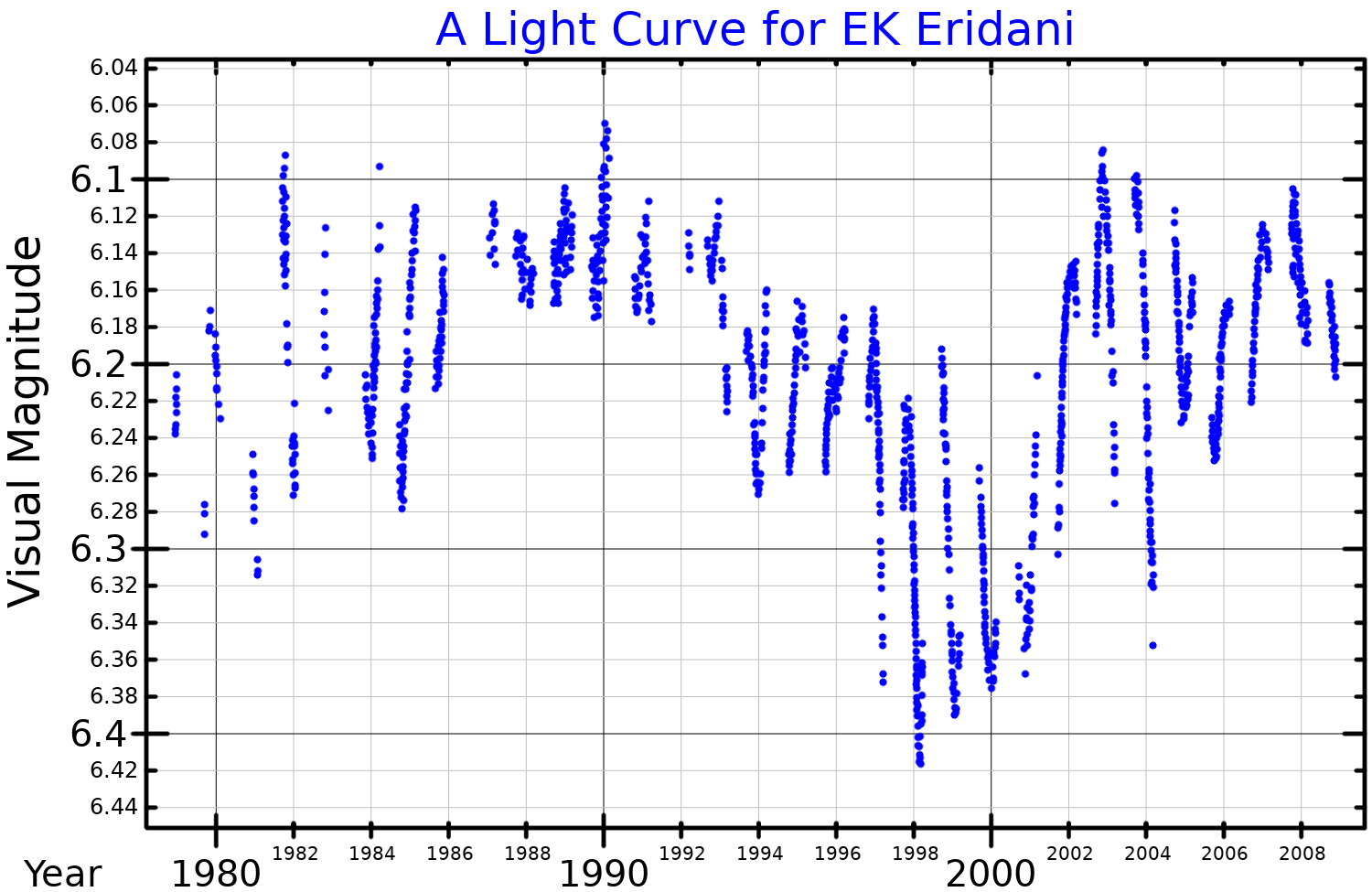
- A visual band light curve for EK Eridani, adapted from Dall et al. (2010)

Observation data Epoch J2000.0 Equinox ICRS
- Constellation: Eridanus
- Right ascension: 04^{h} 20^{m} 38.642^{s}
- Declination: −06° 14′ 45.58″
- Apparent magnitude (V): 6.08 to 6.42

Characteristics
- Spectral type: G8 IV-III or K0 III
- B−V color index: 0.901±0.002
- Variable type: BY Dra

Astrometry
Radial velocity (R_{v})	6.866±0.0002 km/s
Proper motion (μ)	RA: +92.020 mas/yr Dec.: −55.192 mas/yr
Parallax (π)	15.6213±0.0236 mas
Distance	208.8 ± 0.3 ly (64.02 ± 0.10 pc)
Absolute magnitude (M_{V})	2.22

Details
Mass	1.84±0.12 M_{☉}
Radius	4.96±0.14 R_{☉}
Luminosity	15.07±0.35 L_{☉}
Surface gravity (log g)	3.39±0.12 cgs
Temperature	5,135±60 K
Metallicity [Fe/H]	+0.02±0.04 dex
Rotation	308.8±2.5 d
Rotational velocity (v sin i)	< 1.6±0.4 km/s

Other designations
- EK Eri, NSV 1563, BD−06° 875, GC 5264, HD 27536, HIP 20263, HR 1362, SAO 131129, PPM 186813

Database references
SIMBAD	data

EK Eridani is a single variable star in the equatorial constellation of Eridanus. It has the designation HR 1362 from the Bright Star Catalogue; EK Eridani is the variable star designation, abbreviated EK Eri. This star is dimly visible to the naked eye with a brightness that fluctuates between 6.1 and 6.4 Based on parallax measurements, it is located at a distance of 209 light years from the Sun. The star is drifting further away with a heliocentric radial velocity of 6.9 km/s.

From South Africa in 1964, R. Lake reported a variation of 0.7 in the visual magnitude of this star. In 1973, W. P. Bidelman and D. J. MacConnell placed HR 1362 on a list of brighter stars of astrophysical interest because it displayed emission in the H and K lines, although they were uncertain of this finding. F. M. Walter and S. Bowyer detected X-ray emission from this star in 1973, another indicator of magnetic activity in the chromosphere. A series of measurements of the brightness of this star were made from 1979 until 1984, demonstrating it is variable with a 154-day period. At the time, this was the longest period known for a chromospherically active star. By 1990, this period was revised upward to 335 days.

K. G. Strassmeier and associates found the stellar spectrum and color indices to be consistent with a stellar classification of G8 III-IV for HR 1362. They confirmed the moderately strong H and K emission lines as being overactive by over an order of magnitude compared to other cool giant stars. The level of magnetic activity for this star is unusually high for its rotation period, which in 1993 led K. Stępień to suggest it was a strongly magnetic Ap star while on the main sequence. The mean strength of the magnetic field was determined to be 270 Gauss, which is comparable to the typical field strength of RS CVn or FK Com type variable stars.

This is an evolving subgiant star with a very slow rotation period of 308.8 days. It is classified as a BY Draconis variable that changes in luminosity as star spots rotate across the visible surface of the star. The lingering magnetic field may be the result of an interaction between the remnant field from an Ap progenitor star and a deep convection zone. At a 60° axial tilt, the field can be successfully modeled as a simple dipole magnet with a persistent cool spot at the magnetic pole. Asteroseismological measurements show EK Eri has 1.84 times the mass of the Sun and 5 times the Sun's radius. It is radiating 15 times the luminosity of the Sun from its enlarged photosphere at an effective temperature of 5,135 K.

== See also ==
- 53 Camelopardalis – a star with properties similar to the EK Eri progenitor.
