= HD 155233 b =

Brown dwarf

Discovery
- Discovered by: Wittenmyer et al.
- Discovery date: October 19, 2015
- Detection method: Radial velocity

Designations
- Alternative names: HIP 84056 b

Orbital characteristics
- Semi-major axis: 2.065+0.059 −0.062 AU
- Eccentricity: 0.079+0.06 −0.053
- Orbital period (sidereal): 825.8+9.9 −8.8 d 2.261+0.027 −0.024 yr
- Inclination: 5.2°±1.1° or 174.8°±1.1°
- Longitude of ascending node: 91°+21° −17°
- Time of periastron: 2,455,368+192 −92 JD
- Argument of periastron: 157°+44° −50°
- Star: HD 155233

Physical characteristics
- Mass: 31.9+8.5 −5.3 M_{J}

HD 155233 b is a confirmed brown dwarf orbiting around the K-type giant star HD 155233 every 826 days, some 244 light-years away. It has a minimum mass of almost 3 times that of Jupiter, and so was initially thought to be a gas giant exoplanet similar to Jupiter. However, in 2023 the inclination and true mass of HD 155233 b were determined via astrometry, showing it to be a brown dwarf about 32 times the mass of Jupiter in a nearly face-on orbit.

HD 155233 b was discovered by Wittenmyer et al. in October 2015. The orbit and mass were refined in 2016, and again in 2023.
