= HD 10939 =

Star in the constellation Eridanus

Observation data Epoch J2000.0 Equinox ICRS
- Constellation: Eridanus
- Right ascension: 01^{h} 46^{m} 06.3^{s}
- Declination: −53° 31′ 19″
- Apparent magnitude (V): 5.03

Characteristics
- Evolutionary stage: main sequence
- Spectral type: A1V
- U−B color index: 0.05
- B−V color index: 0.04

Astrometry
Proper motion (μ)	RA: +126.534 mas/yr Dec.: +59.909 mas/yr
Parallax (π)	16.0575±0.0693 mas
Distance	203.1 ± 0.9 ly (62.3 ± 0.3 pc)
Absolute magnitude (M_{V})	+1.08

Details
Mass	2.3 M_{☉}
Radius	2.27 R_{☉}
Luminosity	32 L_{☉}
Surface gravity (log g)	4.09 cgs
Temperature	9,110 K
Rotation	0.69 days
Rotational velocity (v sin i)	72.8 km/s
Age	346 Myr

Other designations
- CPD−54°377, SAO 232520, HD 10939, HR 520, q^{2} Eridani

Database references
SIMBAD	data

HD 10939 is a star with an apparent magnitude of 5.03, making it visible to the naked eye. It glows white with a spectral type of A1V, and has a surface temperature of around 7,500 to 10,000 K.
