= HD 28375 =

Star in the constellation Taurus

- Location of HD 28375 (circled)

Observation data Epoch J2000 Equinox ICRS
- Constellation: Taurus
- Right ascension: 04^{h} 28^{m} 32.12105^{s}
- Declination: +01° 22′ 50.9711″
- Apparent magnitude (V): 5.53

Characteristics
- Evolutionary stage: main sequence
- Spectral type: B5V
- U−B color index: −0.55
- B−V color index: −0.099±0.008

Astrometry
Radial velocity (R_{v})	18.0±4.3 km/s
Proper motion (μ)	RA: +20.236 mas/yr Dec.: −20.406 mas/yr
Parallax (π)	6.4010±0.0687 mas
Distance	510 ± 5 ly (156 ± 2 pc)
Absolute magnitude (M_{V})	0.19

Details
Mass	3.9 M_{☉}
Radius	3.0 R_{☉}
Luminosity	311 L_{☉}
Surface gravity (log g)	3.92 cgs
Temperature	13,267 K
Metallicity [Fe/H]	0.05±0.06 dex
Rotational velocity (v sin i)	13±3 km/s
Age	3.1±2.1 Myr

Other designations
- BD+01°757, FK5 1123, GC 5441, HD 28375, HIP 20884, HR 1415, SAO 111845

Database references
SIMBAD	data

HD 28375 is a single star in the equatorial constellation of Taurus, near the southern constellation border with Eridanus. It was previously known by the Flamsteed designation 44 Eridani, although the name has fallen out of use because constellations were redrawn, placing the star out of Eridanus and into Taurus. The star is blue-white in hue and is dimly visible to the naked eye with an apparent visual magnitude of 5.53. The distance to this star is approximately 510 light-years based on parallax. It is drifting further away with a radial velocity of 18 km/s, after having come to within an estimated 249 light-years some 3.7 million years ago.

Molnar (1972) found a stellar classification of B5V for this object, matching a B-type main-sequence star. Houk and Swift assigned it a class of B5 III/IV, suggesting it is a more evolved star that is entering the giant stage. Evolutionary models place it near the end of its main sequence life. It has nearly four times the mass of the Sun and is around three million years old, with a projected rotational velocity of just 13 km/s. The star is radiating 311 times the luminosity of the Sun from its photosphere at an effective temperature of about 13,267 K.

An infrared excess has been detected, indicating the presence of a circumstellar disk. The dust has a temperature of about 119 K and is orbiting 67 AU from the star.
