= I Eridani =

B-type star in the constellation Eridanus

i Eridani
Observation data Epoch J2000.0 Equinox ICRS
- Constellation: Eridanus
- Right ascension: 03^{h} 53^{m} 38.95^{s}
- Declination: −34° 43′ 56.3″
- Apparent magnitude (V): 5.11

Characteristics
- Evolutionary stage: main sequence
- Spectral type: B6/7V
- B−V color index: −0.13

Astrometry
Proper motion (μ)	RA: +31.797 mas/yr Dec.: −1.902 mas/yr
Parallax (π)	9.0016±0.0834 mas
Distance	362 ± 3 ly (111 ± 1 pc)
Absolute magnitude (M_{V})	−0.02

Details
Mass	3.8 M_{☉}
Radius	2.5 R_{☉}
Luminosity	226 L_{☉}
Surface gravity (log g)	4.26 cgs
Temperature	13,772 K
Rotational velocity (v sin i)	43 km/s
Age	207 Myr

Other designations
- CD−35°1455, HD 24626, HR 1214, SAO 194608

Database references
SIMBAD	data

i Eridani (HD 24626) is a B-type main-sequence star in the constellation Eridanus. With an apparent magnitude of 5.11, it is faintly visible to the naked eye on a clear night.
