= 64 Eridani =

Single, yellow-white hued star in the constellation Eridanus

- Location of 64 Eridani (circled in red)

Observation data Epoch J2000 Equinox ICRS
- Constellation: Eridanus
- Right ascension: 04^{h} 59^{m} 55.73680^{s}
- Declination: −12° 32′ 14.7004″
- Apparent magnitude (V): 4.77 – 4.79

Characteristics
- Evolutionary stage: subgiant
- Spectral type: F0 V
- B−V color index: 0.266
- Variable type: δ Sct

Astrometry
Radial velocity (R_{v})	−8.9±4.2 km/s
Proper motion (μ)	RA: +39.894 mas/yr Dec.: −87.358 mas/yr
Parallax (π)	11.5441±0.0851 mas
Distance	283 ± 2 ly (86.6 ± 0.6 pc)
Absolute magnitude (M_{V})	+0.03

Details
Mass	2.33 M_{☉}
Radius	5.22 R_{☉}
Luminosity	65 L_{☉}
Surface gravity (log g)	3.37 cgs
Temperature	7,346±250 K
Rotational velocity (v sin i)	212 km/s
Age	756 Myr

Other designations
- 64 Eri, S Eri, BD−12°1047, HD 32045, HIP 23231, HR 1611, SAO 150064

Database references
SIMBAD	data

64 Eridani is a single, yellow-white hued star in the constellation Eridanus, having variable star designation S Eridani. It is faintly visible to the naked eye with an apparent visual magnitude of 4.8. The annual parallax shift is measured at 12.01 mas, which equates to a distance of about 283 light years. In addition to its proper motion, it is moving closer to the Sun with a radial velocity of around −9 km/s.

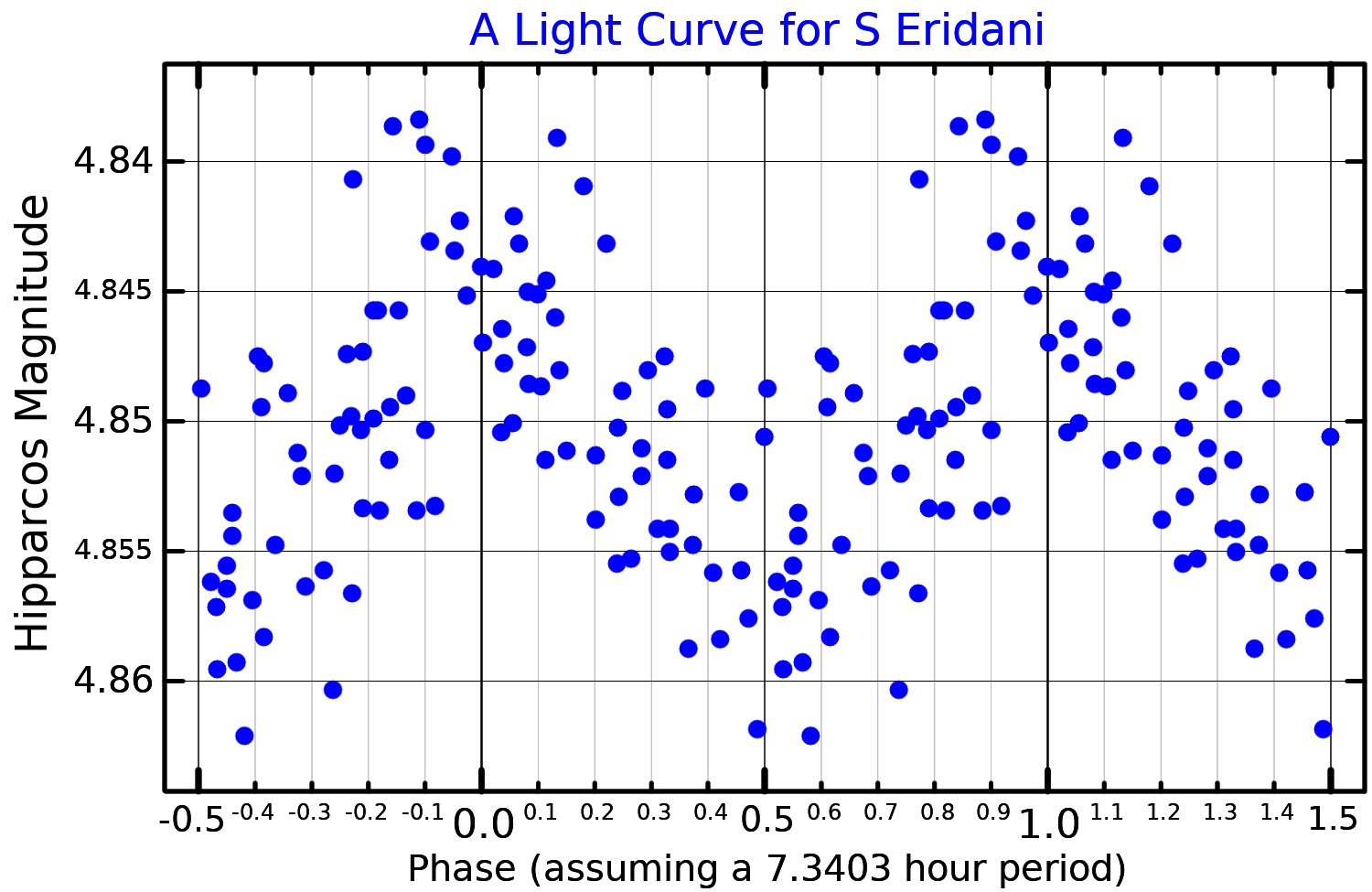
A light curve for S Eridani, adapted from Koen and Eyer (2002)

This is an F-type star with a stellar classification of F0 V. It is catalogued a low amplitude Delta Scuti variable with a primary period of 0.273 days. It was originally classified, tentatively, as an RR Lyrae variable of type 'c'.

64 Eridani is spinning rapidly with a projected rotational velocity of 212 km/s. This is giving the star an oblate shape with an equatorial bulge; its equatorial radius is 8% larger than its polar radius. The star is an estimated 756 million years old with 2.3 times the mass of the Sun. It is radiating 65 times the Sun's luminosity from its photosphere at an effective temperature of roughly 7,346 K.
