= HR 968 =

Triple star system

- Location of HR 968 (circled in red)

Observation data Epoch J2000.0 Equinox ICRS
- Constellation: Eridanus
- Right ascension: 03^{h} 12^{m} 25.75^{s}
- Declination: −44° 25′ 10.8″
- Apparent magnitude (V): 5.93

Characteristics
- Spectral type: F7III+A0V
- B−V color index: +0.44

Astrometry
Proper motion (μ)	RA: +81.63 mas/yr Dec.: −4.57 mas/yr
Parallax (π)	23.53±0.62 mas
Distance	139 ± 4 ly (42 ± 1 pc)
Absolute magnitude (M_{V})	+2.78

Orbit
Period (P)	44.93 yr
Semi-major axis (a)	0.399″
Eccentricity (e)	0.891
Inclination (i)	180°

Details

A
Mass	1.34 M_{☉}

B
Mass	1.24 M_{☉}

C
Mass	0.87 M_{☉}

Other designations
- CD−44°1025, HD 20121, HR 968, SAO 216209

Database references
SIMBAD	data
- A
- B
- C

HR 968 (HD 20121) is a triple star in the constellation Eridanus with an apparent magnitude of 5.93. A close pair, a magnitude 6.6 F-type star and a magnitude 6.9 A-type star, are accompanied by a fainter common proper motion companion 3.6″ away. The three combined are barely visible to the naked eye. It had the Bayer designation u Eridani by Nicolas Louis de Lacaille before Francis Baily dropped the title.
