= Xi Eridani =

Star in the constellation Eridanus

ξ Eridani
- Location of ξ Eridani (circled in red)

Observation data Epoch J2000.0 Equinox J2000.0 (ICRS)
- Constellation: Eridanus
- Right ascension: 04^{h} 23^{m} 40.85270^{s}
- Declination: −03° 44′ 43.6771″
- Apparent magnitude (V): 5.17

Characteristics
- Evolutionary stage: main sequence
- Spectral type: A2 V
- U−B color index: +0.08
- B−V color index: +0.08

Astrometry
| Radial velocity (R_{v}) | −11.0 km/s |
| Proper motion (μ) | RA: −47.36 mas/yr Dec.: −54.91 mas/yr |
| Parallax (π) | 15.60±0.25 mas |
| Distance | 209 ± 3 ly (64 ± 1 pc) |
| Absolute magnitude (M_{V}) | +1.59 |

Details
| Mass | 2.29 M_{☉} |
| Radius | 2.2 R_{☉} |
| Luminosity | 27.6 L_{☉} |
| Surface gravity (log g) | 3.73 cgs |
| Temperature | 8,400 K |
| Rotational velocity (v sin i) | 194.3±2.3 km/s |
| Age | 450 Myr |

Other designations
- ξ Eri, BD−04°818, 42 Eridani, FK5 1120, HD 27861, HIP 20507, HR 1383, SAO 131176

Database references
| SIMBAD | data |

ξ Eridani (Latinised as Xi Eridani) is a solitary star in the constellation Eridanus. With an apparent visual magnitude of 5.17, it is faintly visible to the naked eye on a clear, dark night. Based upon an annual parallax shift of 0.00156 arcseconds, it is located around 209 light years from the Sun. The star is considered a member of the Sirius supercluster.

This is an ordinary A-type main sequence star with a stellar classification of A2 V, indicating that it is generating energy through the thermonuclear fusion of hydrogen into helium in its core region. It is around 450 million years old and has a relatively high rate of rotation with a projected rotational velocity of 194 km/s. The star has about 2.3 times the mass of the Sun, 2.2 times the Sun's radius, and radiates 27.6 times the solar luminosity from its outer atmosphere at an effective temperature of 8,400 K.
