= 15 Eridani =

Star in the constellation Eridanus

- Location of 15 Eridani (circled in red)

Observation data Epoch J2000 Equinox ICRS
- Constellation: Eridanus
- Right ascension: 03^{h} 18^{m} 22.10504^{s}
- Declination: −22° 30′ 40.0191″
- Apparent magnitude (V): 4.875 (6.57 / 5.32)

Characteristics
- Evolutionary stage: red clump
- Spectral type: K0III
- B−V color index: +0.90

Astrometry
Radial velocity (R_{v})	23.90±0.5 km/s
Proper motion (μ)	RA: 13.08 mas/yr Dec.: 13.33 mas/yr
Parallax (π)	12.77±1.17 mas
Distance	260 ± 20 ly (78 ± 7 pc)
Absolute magnitude (M_{V})	+0.85

Orbit
Period (P)	118.16 yr
Semi-major axis (a)	0.340″
Eccentricity (e)	0.030
Inclination (i)	66.6°
Longitude of the node (Ω)	271.6°
Periastron epoch (T)	1934.24
Argument of periastron (ω) (secondary)	333.5°

Details

15 Eri A
Mass	2.32 M_{☉}
Luminosity	72.4 L_{☉}
Temperature	4,960±31 K
Rotational velocity (v sin i)	4.5±0.2 km/s
Age	1.44 Gyr

Other designations
- 15 Eri, CD−22°1146, HD 20610, HIP 15382, HR 994, SAO 168452, WDS J03184-2231

Database references
SIMBAD	data

15 Eridani is a binary star system in the equatorial constellation of Eridanus. It is visible to the naked eye as a faint, orange-hued star with an apparent visual magnitude of 4.875. Based upon parallax measurements, the system is located around 260 light years away from the Sun. It is moving further from the Earth with a heliocentric radial velocity of 24 km/s.

This system has an orbital period of 118.16 years with an eccentricity of 0.030 and a semimajor axis of 0.340″. The primary member, designated component A, is a magnitude 5.32 giant star with a stellar classification of K0 III. It is a red clump giant, which means it is on the horizontal branch and is generating energy through helium fusion at its core. This star has 1.44 billion years old with 2.32 times the mass of the Sun. It is radiating 72.4 times the luminosity of the Sun from its enlarged photosphere at an effective temperature of 4,960 K. The companion, component B, has a magnitude of 6.57.
