= Omega Eridani =

Star in the constellation Eridanus

ω Eridani
- Location of ω Eridani (circled in red)

Observation data Epoch J2000.0 Equinox J2000.0 (ICRS)
- Constellation: Eridanus
- Right ascension: 04^{h} 52^{m} 53.66995^{s}
- Declination: −05° 27′ 09.6972″
- Apparent magnitude (V): 4.37

Characteristics
- Spectral type: A9 IVn
- U−B color index: +0.12
- B−V color index: +0.26

Astrometry
Radial velocity (R_{v})	−8.3 km/s
Proper motion (μ)	RA: −17.86 mas/yr Dec.: +25.57 mas/yr
Parallax (π)	13.88±0.24 mas
Distance	235 ± 4 ly (72 ± 1 pc)
Absolute magnitude (M_{V})	0.10

Details
Radius	6.7 R_{☉}
Luminosity	69 L_{☉}
Surface gravity (log g)	3.4 cgs
Temperature	6,878 K
Metallicity [Fe/H]	0.18 dex
Rotational velocity (v sin i)	186 km/s

Other designations
- ω Eri, BD−05°1068, 61 Eridani, HD 31109, HIP 22701, HR 1560, SAO 131568

Database references
SIMBAD	data

Omega Eridani (ω Eri) is a single star in the constellation Eridanus. It is visible to the naked eye with an apparent visual magnitude is 4.37. The distance to this star, as determined by the parallax method, is around 235 light years.

It is an A-type subgiant star with a stellar classification of A9 IVn, where the 'n' suffix indicates a broad ("nebulous") absorption due to rotation. The projected rotational velocity is 186 km/s. This gives the star an oblate shape with an equator that is 13% wider than the polar radius. The angular size of Omega Eridani is 0.87 mas. At an estimated distance of the star, this yields a physical size of around 6.7 times the radius of the Sun.

Omega Eridani was long thought to be a single-lined spectroscopic binary system, with an orbital period of 3,057 days (8.4 years) and an eccentricity of 0.46. However, newer and higher-quality radial velocity observations find no evidence for a companion, casting serious doubt on the status of Omega Eridani as a binary star.
