= 14 Eridani =

Star in the constellation Eridanus

- Location of 14 Eridani (circled in red)

Observation data Epoch J2000 Equinox ICRS
- Constellation: Eridanus
- Right ascension: 03^{h} 16^{m} 35.75439^{s}
- Declination: −09° 09′ 16.3318″
- Apparent magnitude (V): 6.143

Characteristics
- Evolutionary stage: main sequence
- Spectral type: F5 V Fe−0.7 CH−0.5
- B−V color index: 0.399

Astrometry
Radial velocity (R_{v})	−5.3±2.9 km/s
Proper motion (μ)	RA: +8.057 mas/yr Dec.: +22.871 mas/yr
Parallax (π)	26.9856±0.2356 mas
Distance	121 ± 1 ly (37.1 ± 0.3 pc)
Absolute magnitude (M_{V})	3.47

Details
Mass	1.31 M_{☉}
Radius	1.48+0.9 −0.8 R_{☉}
Luminosity	3.87±0.04 L_{☉}
Surface gravity (log g)	4.34±0.14 cgs
Temperature	6,719±228 K
Metallicity [Fe/H]	−0.10 dex
Age	1.391 Gyr

Other designations
- 14 Eri, BD−09°627, GC 3918, HD 20395, HIP 15244, HR 988, SAO 130395, PPM 185595, WDS J03158-0849B

Database references
SIMBAD	data

14 Eridani is a star in the equatorial constellation Eridanus. It has an apparent visual magnitude of 6.143 and is moving closer to the Sun with a radial velocity of around −5 km/s. The measured annual parallax shift is 29.26 mas, which provides an estimated distance of about 121 light years. Proper motion studies indicate that this is an astrometric binary.

The visible component has a stellar classification of F5 V Fe−0.7 CH−0.5, which indicates it has the spectrum of an F-type main-sequence star with mild underabundances of iron and methylidyne. It is 1.4 billion years old with 1.3 times the mass of the Sun and 1.5 times the Sun's radius. The star is radiating 3.87 times the luminosity of the Sun from its photosphere at an effective temperature of 6,719 K. The system has been detected as a source of X-ray emission.
