= 62 Eridani =

Binary star system

- Location of b Eridani (circled)

Observation data Epoch J2000.0 Equinox ICRS
- Constellation: Eridanus
- Right ascension: 04^{h} 56^{m} 24.18609^{s}
- Declination: −05° 10′ 16.8710″
- Apparent magnitude (V): 5.48

Characteristics
- Evolutionary stage: main sequence
- Spectral type: B5III
- B−V colour index: −0.123±0.004

Astrometry
| Radial velocity (R_{v}) | 24±4.3 km/s |
| Proper motion (μ) | RA: −6.395 mas/yr Dec.: −1.809 mas/yr |
| Parallax (π) | 4.5440±0.1145 mas |
| Distance | 720 ± 20 ly (220 ± 6 pc) |
| Absolute magnitude (M_{V}) | −1.23 |

Details

Aa
| Mass | 5.69 M_{☉} |

Ab
| Mass | 1.46 M_{☉} |

Other designations
- b Eri, 62 Eridani, BD−05 1091, GC 5894, HD 31512, HIP 22958, HR 1582, SAO 149924, PPM 214891, TYC 5899-1192-1

Database references
| SIMBAD | Star |

62 Eridani (b Eri) is a double star located in the constellation Eridanus and is approximately 720 light-years away. The combined apparent magnitude of the two stars is 5.5.

The two stars are 0.6″ apart and have an estimated orbital period of 633 years. The primary component is a hot blue giant star with a spectral class of B5III and a mass of about 5.7 M_{☉}. Despite the giant luminosity class, it is modelled to still be on the main sequence. Other publications have given spectral classes of B5V or B6V. The secondary is magnitude 9.6 and has a mass of about 1.5 M_{☉}.

62 Eridani moves within the galaxy at a speed of 24.2 km/sec relative to the Sun. Its distance from the galactic center is estimated to be between 24,700 and 29,700 light-years.

The 9th-magnitude star BD−05°1093 is a possible common proper motion companion 66″ away.
