= 39 Eridani =

Star in the constellation Eridanus

- Location of 35 Eridani (circled in red)

Observation data Epoch J2000.0 Equinox ICRS
- Constellation: Eridanus
- Right ascension: 04^{h} 14^{m} 23.68902^{s}
- Declination: −10° 15′ 22.6083″
- Apparent magnitude (V): 4.87 (5.07 + 8.68)

Characteristics
- Spectral type: K3 III + G2 V
- B−V color index: 1.156±0.003

Astrometry
Radial velocity (R_{v})	6.8±0.8 km/s
Proper motion (μ)	RA: −7.19 mas/yr Dec.: −161.05 mas/yr
Parallax (π)	13.46±0.60 mas
Distance	240 ± 10 ly (74 ± 3 pc)
Absolute magnitude (M_{V})	0.52

Details

39 Eri A
Mass	1.77±0.49 M_{☉}
Radius	12 R_{☉}
Luminosity	81.3 L_{☉}
Surface gravity (log g)	2.42±0.11 cgs
Temperature	4,641±92 K
Metallicity [Fe/H]	0.18±0.06 dex
Rotational velocity (v sin i)	1.6 km/s
Age	1.12+0.36 −0.27 Gyr

39 Eri B
Radius	1.15+0.10 −0.06 R_{☉}
Luminosity	1.369+0.07 −0.06 L_{☉}
Temperature	5,816+168 −223 K

Other designations
- 39 Eri, BD−10°867, GC 5114, HD 26846, HIP 19777, HR 1318, SAO 149478, WDS J04144-1015

Database references
SIMBAD	data

39 Eridani is a wide binary star system in the equatorial constellation of Eridanus. It is visible to the naked eye as a faint, orange-hued star with a combined apparent visual magnitude of 4.87. As of 2015, the components had an angular separation of 6.4″ along a position angle of 143°. The system is moving further from the Sun with a heliocentric radial velocity of +7 km/s.

The magnitude 5.07 primary, designated component A, is an aging giant star with a stellar classification of K3 III. This object is more than a billion years old with 1.77 times the mass of the Sun. With the hydrogen at its core exhausted, the star has expanded to 12 times the Sun's radius. It is a candidate super metal-rich star, showing a significant overabundance of iron compared to the Sun. 39 Eridani A is radiating 81.3 times the luminosity of the Sun from its swollen photosphere at an effective temperature of 4,641 K.

The secondary, component B, is a magnitude 8.68 G-type main-sequence star with a class of G2 V. It has 1.15 times the Sun's radius and shines with 1.37 times the luminosity of the Sun at an effective temperature of 5,816 K.
