= 66 Eridani =

Star in the constellation Eridanus

- Location of 66 Eridani (circled)

Observation data Epoch J2000 Equinox ICRS
- Constellation: Eridanus
- Right ascension: 05^{h} 06^{m} 45.65314^{s}
- Declination: −04° 39′ 18.5939″
- Apparent magnitude (V): 5.12

Characteristics
- Evolutionary stage: main sequence
- Spectral type: B9V
- U−B color index: −0.16
- B−V color index: −0.06
- Variable type: α^{2} CVn?

Astrometry
Radial velocity (R_{v})	32.28±0.10 km/s
Proper motion (μ)	RA: +10.70 mas/yr Dec.: −0.78 mas/yr
Parallax (π)	10.56±0.34 mas
Distance	309 ± 10 ly (95 ± 3 pc)
Absolute magnitude (M_{V})	0.37

Orbit
Period (P)	5.5226013 ± 0.0000020 d
Eccentricity (e)	0.0844±0.0013
Periastron epoch (T)	2441356.499±0.017
Argument of periastron (ω) (secondary)	160.9±1.1°
Semi-amplitude (K_{1}) (primary)	102.83±0.20 km/s
Semi-amplitude (K_{2}) (secondary)	100.35±0.19 km/s

Details

66 Eri A
Mass	2.629±0.032 M_{☉}
Radius	1.948±0.063 R_{☉}
Luminosity	51.3±3.3 L_{☉}
Surface gravity (log g)	4.28±0.03 cgs
Temperature	11,077 K
Rotational velocity (v sin i)	17.1±0.2 km/s
Age	30 Myr

66 Eri B
Mass	2.566±0.032 M_{☉}
Radius	1.919±0.061 R_{☉}
Luminosity	46.9±3.0 L_{☉}
Surface gravity (log g)	4.28±0.03 cgs
Temperature	10,914 K
Rotational velocity (v sin i)	16.9±0.2 km/s

Other designations
- EN Eri, BD−04°1044, HD 32964, HIP 23794, HR 1657, SAO 131777

Database references
SIMBAD	data

66 Eridani is a binary star in the constellation of Eridanus. The combined apparent magnitude of the system is 5.12 on average. Parallax measurements by Hipparcos put the system at some 309 light-years (95 parsecs) away. It lies half a degree northwest of beta Eridani.

This is a spectroscopic binary: the two stars cannot be individually resolved, but periodic Doppler shifts in its spectrum mean there must be orbital motion. The two stars orbit each other every 5.5 days. Their orbit is fairly circular, with an eccentricity of 0.0844.

The combined spectrum of 66 Eridani matches that of a B-type main-sequence star, and the two stars have similar masses. The spectrum also shows excess of mercury and manganese, as it is a type of chemically peculiar star called a mercury-manganese star. 66 Eridani is an Alpha^{2} Canum Venaticorum variable. For this reason, it has been given the designation EN Eridani.
