= 32 Eridani =

Binary star in the constellation of Eridanus

- Location of 32 Eridani (circled in red)

Observation data Epoch J2000 Equinox ICRS
- Constellation: Eridanus
- 32 Eridani
- Right ascension: 03^{h} 54^{m} 17.50181^{s}
- Declination: −02° 57′ 17.0397″
- Apparent magnitude (V): 4.45
- 32 Eridani A
- Right ascension: 03^{h} 54^{m} 17.50^{s}
- Declination: −02° 57′ 17.0″
- Apparent magnitude (V): 4.79
- 32 Eridani B
- Right ascension: 03^{h} 54^{m} 17.41^{s}
- Declination: −02° 57′ 10.3″
- Apparent magnitude (V): 6.14

Characteristics

32 Eridani A
- Evolutionary stage: giant star
- Spectral type: G8III

32 Eridani B
- Evolutionary stage: main sequence
- Spectral type: A1V

Astrometry

A
Proper motion (μ)	RA: +26.330 mas/yr Dec.: +0.079 mas/yr
Parallax (π)	9.4562±0.1108 mas
Distance	345 ± 4 ly (106 ± 1 pc)

B
Proper motion (μ)	RA: +26.878 mas/yr Dec.: +1.007 mas/yr
Parallax (π)	9.6777±0.0623 mas
Distance	337 ± 2 ly (103.3 ± 0.7 pc)

Position (relative to 32 Eridani A)
Component	32 Eridani B
Epoch of observation	2021
Angular distance	6.90″
Position angle	349°

Details

32 Eridani A
Mass	1.29 M_{☉}
Radius	14.6 R_{☉}
Luminosity	138 L_{☉}
Surface gravity (log g)	2.63 cgs
Temperature	4,970 K
Metallicity [Fe/H]	−0.16 dex
Rotational velocity (v sin i)	2.7 km/s
Age	706 Myr

32 Eridani B
Mass	2.36 M_{☉}
Radius	2.32 R_{☉}
Luminosity	36 L_{☉}
Temperature	9,294 K
Rotational velocity (v sin i)	180 km/s
Age	461 Myr

Other designations
- 32 Eri, HIP 18255
- 32 Eridani A: HD 24555, HR 1212
- 32 Eridani B: HD 24554, HR 1211

Database references
SIMBAD	data
- A
- B

32 Eridani (abbreviated 32 Eri) is a binary star in the constellation of Eridanus. The two stars are designated HD 24555 (32 Eridani A) and HD 24554 (32 Eridani B). They share a single entry in the Hipparcos catalogue, HIP 18255, but have separate entries in the Bright Star Catalogue, HR 1212 and HR 1211.

32 Eridani is visible to the naked eye as a single star with an apparent magnitude of 4.45. Individually, 32 Eridani A shines at magnitude 4.79 while 32 Eridani B has a magnitude of 6.14. As of 2021, the pair had an angular separation of about 6.90 arcseconds with a position angle of 349°.

Based on measurements of parallax by the Gaia mission, the system lies at a distance of about 340 light-years (22,000,000 AU) from Earth.

The primary component, 32 Eridani A, is an evolved yellow giant star of spectral type G8III. It has a radius about 15 times that of the Sun and a luminosity around 138 times solar, with an effective temperature of about 4,970 K.

The secondary component, 32 Eridani B, is a main-sequence star of spectral type A1V. It has a surface temperature of roughly 9,294 K and rotates rapidly with a projected rotational velocity of about 180 km/s, giving the star a noticeably flattened shape due to its rotation.
