= HD 22663 =

Star in the constellation Eridanus

- Location of HD 22663 (circled in red)

Observation data Epoch J2000 Equinox ICRS
- Constellation: Eridanus
- Right ascension: 03^{h} 37^{m} 05.67804^{s}
- Declination: −40° 16′ 28.7772″
- Apparent magnitude (V): 4.57

Characteristics
- Evolutionary stage: red giant branch
- Spectral type: K1 III
- B−V color index: 1.023±0.028

Astrometry
Radial velocity (R_{v})	+11.50±0.02 km/s
Proper motion (μ)	RA: −13.532 mas/yr Dec.: −9.929 mas/yr
Parallax (π)	13.2285±0.3968 mas
Distance	247 ± 7 ly (76 ± 2 pc)
Absolute magnitude (M_{V})	+0.32

Details
Mass	1.43±0.25 M_{☉}
Radius	13.01±0.54 R_{☉}
Luminosity	95.5+16.7 −14.2 L_{☉}
Surface gravity (log g)	2.75±0.01 cgs
Temperature	4,660±21 K
Metallicity [Fe/H]	−0.15±0.05 dex
Rotational velocity (v sin i)	1.40±0.55 km/s
Age	2.58±1.22 Gyr

Other designations
- y Eri, CD−40°1008, FK5 130, HD 22663, HIP 16870, HR 1106, SAO 216405

Database references
SIMBAD	data

HD 22663 (y Eridani) is a candidate astrometric binary star system in the equatorial constellation of Eridanus. It is visible to the naked eye with an apparent visual magnitude of 4.57. Based upon an annual parallax shift of 13.2 mas, it is located around 247 light years from the Sun. It is moving further away from the Earth with a heliocentric radial velocity of +11.5 km/s, having come within 140.9 ly some 3.76 million years ago.

The visible component is an orange-hued giant star with a stellar classification of K1 III, having exhausted the hydrogen at its core and evolved away from the main sequence. It has an estimated 1.4 times the mass of the Sun and has expanded to 13 times the Sun's radius. At the age of 2.6 billion years, this star is radiating 95 times the Sun's luminosity from its enlarged photosphere at an effective temperature of 4,660 K.
