= Iota Eridani =

Solitary red clump giant star in the constellation Eridanus

ι Eridani
- Location of ι Eridani (circled in red)

Observation data Epoch J2000.0 Equinox J2000.0 (ICRS)
- Constellation: Eridanus
- Right ascension: 02^{h} 40^{m} 40.03501^{s}
- Declination: −39° 51′ 19.3541″
- Apparent magnitude (V): 4.11

Characteristics
- Evolutionary stage: Red clump
- Spectral type: K0 III
- U−B color index: +0.74
- B−V color index: +1.02

Astrometry
Radial velocity (R_{v})	−9.30±0.70 km/s
Proper motion (μ)	RA: +135.92 mas/yr Dec.: −27.53 mas/yr
Parallax (π)	21.65±0.18 mas
Distance	151 ± 1 ly (46.2 ± 0.4 pc)
Absolute magnitude (M_{V})	0.877

Details
Mass	1.29±0.01 M_{☉}
Radius	11.17±0.06 R_{☉}
Luminosity	54.7±0.5 L_{☉}
Surface gravity (log g)	2.65±0.10 cgs
Temperature	4,700±30 K
Metallicity [Fe/H]	−0.34±0.02 dex
Age	3.55±0.12 Gyr

Other designations
- ι Eri, CD−40°689, FK5 1075, HD 16815, HIP 12486, HR 794, SAO 215999

Database references
SIMBAD	data

Iota Eridani (ι Eri) is a solitary star in the constellation Eridanus. It is visible to the naked eye with an apparent magnitude of 4.11. With an annual parallax shift of 0.02165 arcseconds, it lies at an estimated distance of about 151 light years.

This is an evolved giant star with a stellar classification of K0 III. The measured angular diameter, after correcting for limb darkening, is 2.248±0.014 mas. This star is 3.55 billion years old, sufficient to have exhausted the hydrogen at its core and reached a red clump stage. It is only around 29% more massive than the Sun, but is eleven times larger. It radiates 54.7 times the solar luminosity from its outer atmosphere at an effective temperature of 4,700 K.
