= 45 Eridani =

Star in the constellation Eridanus

- Location of 45 Eridani (circled in red)

Observation data Epoch J2000.0 Equinox ICRS
- Constellation: Eridanus
- Right ascension: 04^{h} 31^{m} 52.66863^{s}
- Declination: −00° 02′ 38.4398″
- Apparent magnitude (V): 4.91

Characteristics
- Evolutionary stage: giant
- Spectral type: K0/1 III
- U−B color index: +1.41
- B−V color index: +1.32±0.04

Astrometry
| Radial velocity (R_{v}) | +15.32±0.15 km/s |
| Proper motion (μ) | RA: −1.469 mas/yr Dec.: −7.681 mas/yr |
| Parallax (π) | 3.7428±0.0998 mas |
| Distance | 870 ± 20 ly (267 ± 7 pc) |
| Absolute magnitude (M_{V}) | −1.59 |

Details
| Mass | 5.4 M_{☉} |
| Radius | 71 R_{☉} |
| Luminosity | 1,587 L_{☉} |
| Surface gravity (log g) | 1.41 cgs |
| Temperature | 4,338 K |
| Metallicity [Fe/H] | −0.17 dex |
| Rotational velocity (v sin i) | <1.4 km/s |
| Age | 164 Myr |

Other designations
- 45 Eri, BD−00°713, GC 5528, HD 28749, HIP 21139, HR 1437, SAO 131270

Database references
| SIMBAD | data |

45 Eridani is a single star located around 870 light years away from the Sun in the equatorial constellation of Eridanus. It is visible to the naked eye as a faint, orange-hued star with an apparent visual magnitude of 4.91. This body is moving away from the Earth with a heliocentric radial velocity of +15 km/s.

The stellar classification for this star is K0/1 III, which indicates this is an aging K-type giant star that has exhausted the hydrogen supply at its core and expanded. It has reached 71 times the Sun's radius and is radiating 1,586 times the luminosity of the Sun from its swollen photosphere at an effective temperature of 4,338 K.
