= 17 Eridani =

Star in the constellation Eridanus

- Location of 17 Eridani (circled in red)

Observation data Epoch J2000.0 Equinox ICRS
- Constellation: Eridanus
- Right ascension: 03^{h} 30^{m} 37.05823^{s}
- Declination: −05° 04′ 30.5239″
- Apparent magnitude (V): 4.74

Characteristics
- Evolutionary stage: main sequence
- Spectral type: B9 III or B9Vs
- B−V color index: −0.092±0.008

Astrometry
Radial velocity (R_{v})	+15.0±4.2 km/s
Proper motion (μ)	RA: 14.23 mas/yr Dec.: 7.27 mas/yr
Parallax (π)	8.07±0.20 mas
Distance	400 ± 10 ly (124 ± 3 pc)
Absolute magnitude (M_{V})	−0.72

Details
Mass	3.55±0.04 M_{☉}
Radius	3.2 R_{☉}
Luminosity	267.9+15.2 −14.4 L_{☉}
Surface gravity (log g)	3.603±0.017 cgs
Temperature	11,143±51 K
Rotational velocity (v sin i)	86 km/s
Age	178+10 −9 Myr

Other designations
- v Eri, 17 Eri, BD−05°674, HD 21790, HIP 16341, HR 1070, SAO 130528

Database references
SIMBAD	data

17 Eridani is a single star in the equatorial constellation of Eridanus. It has the Bayer designation v Eridani, while 17 Eridani is the Flamsteed designation. This object is visible to the naked eye as a faint, white-hued star with an apparent visual magnitude of 4.74. It is moving further from the Earth with a heliocentric radial velocity of around +15 km/s.

Houk and Swift (1999) found a stellar classification of B9 III for this star, while Cowley et al. (1969) show B9 Vs. Stellar models suggest the star is still generating energy through hydrogen fusion at its core, although nearing the end of its main sequence life. It is about 178 million years old with 3.55 times the mass of the Sun and around 3.2 times the size of the Sun. The star is radiating 268 times the Sun's luminosity from its photosphere at an effective temperature of 11,143 K. These coordinates are a source for X-ray emission, which may be coming from an unresolved companion.
