= HD 16754 =

Triple star system in the constellation Eridanus

- Location of HD 16754 (circled in red)

Observation data Epoch J2000 Equinox ICRS
- Constellation: Eridanus
- Right ascension: 02^{h} 39^{m} 47.97^{s}
- Declination: −42° 53′ 30.4″
- Apparent magnitude (V): +4.74

Characteristics
- Spectral type: A1 Vb
- B−V color index: 0.061±0.003

Astrometry
Radial velocity (R_{v})	+18.0±4.2 km/s
Proper motion (μ)	RA: +92.11 mas/yr Dec.: −17.82 mas/yr
Parallax (π)	25.15±0.61 mas
Distance	131.77 ± 0.33 ly (40.4±0.1 pc)
Absolute magnitude (M_{V})	+1.76

Details

s Eri Aa
Mass	2.0 M_{☉}
Radius	1.7 R_{☉}
Luminosity	17.44 L_{☉}
Surface gravity (log g)	4.40±0.14 cgs
Temperature	9,000 K
Metallicity [Fe/H]	−0.06 dex
Rotational velocity (v sin i)	167.6±1.7 or 13.4±1.5 km/s
Age	160 Myr

s Eri Ab1
Mass	0.92 M_{☉}
Radius	0.82 R_{☉}
Temperature	5,400 K
Age	160 Myr

s Eri Ab2
Mass	0.84 M_{☉}
Radius	0.75 R_{☉}
Temperature	5,100 K
Age	160 Myr

Other designations
- s Eri, CD−43°814, FK5 2185, HD 16754, HIP 12413, HR 789, SAO 215996

Database references
SIMBAD	data

HD 16754 is a triple star system in the constellation Eridanus. It has the Bayer designation s Eridani; HD 16754 is the designation from the Henry Draper catalogue. The system is visible to the naked eye as a faint point of light with an apparent visual magnitude of +4.74. It is located 40.4 ± 0.1 parsecs (131.77 ± 0.33 ly) away and is drifting further away with a radial velocity of +18 km/s.

== Characteristics ==
s Eridani was flagged as an astrometric binary based on proper motion measurements made from the Hipparcos spacecraft. Interferometric observations gathered in 2026 revealed it to be an hierarchical triple star system, with the primary star orbited by an inner binary. The components of the inner binary were found to be separated by a projected separation of 0.22 au, while the overall system has a projected separation of 4.6 au. If these values are close to the semi-major axis, combining them and the components' masses in Kepler's third law would imply orbital periods of roughly one month and five years for the inner and outer systems, respectively. The expected timescale of the Kozai mechanism is of 300 years, short enough for changes in the inner system's eccentricity and inclination to be detected in a timescale of a decade.

The primary component, s Eridani Aa, is an A-type main-sequence star with a stellar classification of A1 Vb. It has 2.0 times the mass and 1.7 times the radius of the Sun, with an effective temperature of 9000 K. Earlier measurements showed a high projected rotational velocity of 168 km/s. However, Ammler-von Eiff and Reiners (2012) found a much lower velocity of 13 km/s. The secondary and tertiary components, named s Eridani Ab1 and Ab2, are slightly smaller and cooler than the Sun, with masses of 0.92 and 0.84 M_{☉}, radii of 0.82 and 0.75 R_{☉}, and temperatures of 5,400 and 5,100 K, respectively. The presence of young solar-type stars explain the presence of hard X-ray emission coming from the system, which would not be expected for an A-type star.

The system has been considered to be a member of the Columba association of co-moving stars, which would give it an age of 30 million years, the same as the cluster. However, according to stellar isochrones the system has an age estimated at 160 million years, arguing against membership to the association.

s Eridani makes a wide sextuple system with two optical companions. Component B is separated by 25.3″ from the inner triple, implying a projected separation of a hundred au. It is a binary system itself, consisting of two red dwarfs with masses of 0.36 and 0.31 M_{☉}. It has a combined class in the range M2-5V and is a source of X-ray emission with a luminosity of 924×10^{20} W. The outer companion (D) is also a red dwarf, with a mass of 0.14 M_{☉}. It is separated by 10.9′ from the inner pair, implying a projected separation of 26,000 au.
