= Chi Eridani =

Star in the constellation Eridanus

χ Eridani
- Location of χ Eridani (circled in red)

Observation data Epoch J2000.0 Equinox J2000.0 (ICRS)
- Constellation: Eridanus
- Right ascension: 01^{h} 55^{m} 57.45606^{s}
- Declination: −51° 36′ 31.9736″
- Apparent magnitude (V): 3.70 / 10.7

Characteristics
- Spectral type: G8IV or G8IIIb CNIV
- U−B color index: +0.46
- B−V color index: +0.85

Astrometry
Radial velocity (R_{v})	–6.30 km/s
Proper motion (μ)	RA: +682.281 mas/yr Dec.: −295.332 mas/yr
Parallax (π)	57.3774±0.3291 mas
Distance	56.8 ± 0.3 ly (17.43 ± 0.10 pc)
Absolute magnitude (M_{V})	2.39 / 9.4

Details

A
Mass	1.58 M_{☉}
Radius	3.993±0.027 R_{☉}
Luminosity	9.84±0.39 L_{☉}
Surface gravity (log g)	3.42±0.10 cgs
Temperature	5,115±49 K
Metallicity [Fe/H]	−0.18±0.07 dex
Rotational velocity (v sin i)	4.50 km/s

B
Mass	~0.7 M_{☉}
Radius	~0.7 R_{☉}

Other designations
- χ Eri, CD−52 394, FK5 68, GJ 81, HD 11937, HIP 9007, HR 566, SAO 232573

Database references
SIMBAD	data
ARICNS	A
- B

χ Eridani (Latinised as Chi Eridani) is a binary star system in the constellation Eridanus. It is visible to the naked eye with an apparent visual magnitude of 3.70. The distance to this system, as determined using the parallax method, is around 58 light years. The pair had an angular separation of 5.0 arcseconds as of 1994. This corresponds to a projected separation of around 128 AU.

The primary component is an evolving G-type subgiant star with a stellar classification of G8 IV. It is about 1.6 times the mass of the Sun and has 4 times the Sun's radius. The star shines with 10 times the solar luminosity from its outer atmosphere at an effective temperature of 5,115 K. Unusually for a star of this class, it shows a photometric variability of 0.04 in magnitude, which may be due to a previous mass transfer from the secondary companion, or else from an undiscovered third companion.

The companion is about 7 magnitudes fainter than the primary and may be the source of the X -ray emission from this system. This emission has a luminosity of 504.4×10^{27} erg s^{−1}.
