= Kappa Eridani =

Star in the constellation Eridanus

κ Eridani
- Location of κ Eridani (circled in red)

Observation data Epoch J2000.0 Equinox J2000.0 (ICRS)
- Constellation: Eridanus
- Right ascension: 02^{h} 26^{m} 59.12177^{s}
- Declination: −47° 42′ 13.8247″
- Apparent magnitude (V): 4.25

Characteristics
- Spectral type: B7 IV
- U−B color index: −0.50
- B−V color index: −0.14

Astrometry
Radial velocity (R_{v})	+25.5±0.5 km/s
Proper motion (μ)	RA: +19.32 mas/yr Dec.: −5.54 mas/yr
Parallax (π)	6.42±0.15 mas
Distance	510 ± 10 ly (156 ± 4 pc)
Absolute magnitude (M_{V})	−1.72

Details
Mass	5.0±0.8 M_{☉}
Radius	6 R_{☉}
Luminosity	1,175 L_{☉}
Surface gravity (log g)	3.5±0.1 cgs
Temperature	14,700±400 K
Metallicity [Fe/H]	0.02±0.06 dex
Rotational velocity (v sin i)	10±8 km/s
Age	93 Myr

Other designations
- κ Eri, CD−48°637, FK5 86, HD 15371, HIP 11407, HR 721, SAO 215906

Database references
SIMBAD	data

Kappa Eridani, Latinized from κ Eridani, is a solitary star in the constellation Eridanus. With an apparent visual magnitude of 4.25, it is bright enough to be visible to the naked eye on a dark night. Based upon an annual parallax shift of 0.00642 arc seconds, it is roughly 510 light years distant from the Sun.

This appears to be an evolving B-type subgiant star with a stellar classification of B7 IV. The measured angular diameter is 0.346±0.008 mas. At an estimated distance of Kappa Eridani, this yields a physical size of about six times the radius of the Sun. It has five times the Sun's mass, and radiates 1,175 times the solar luminosity from its outer atmosphere at an effective temperature of 14,700 K. Kappa Eridani is spinning with a projected rotational velocity of 10 km/s and is around 93 million years old.
