= Upsilon1 Eridani =

Red clump star in the constellation Eridanus

υ^{1} Eridani
- Location of υ^{1} Eridani (circled in red)

Observation data Epoch J2000.0 Equinox ICRS
- Constellation: Eridanus
- Right ascension: 04^{h} 33^{m} 30.55236^{s}
- Declination: −29° 45′ 59.3725″
- Apparent magnitude (V): 4.51

Characteristics
- Evolutionary stage: red clump
- Spectral type: K0 III-IV
- U−B color index: +0.70
- B−V color index: +0.98

Astrometry
Radial velocity (R_{v})	+20.89±0.69 km/s
Proper motion (μ)	RA: −114.78 mas/yr Dec.: −271.79 mas/yr
Parallax (π)	25.67±0.24 mas
Distance	127 ± 1 ly (39.0 ± 0.4 pc)
Absolute magnitude (M_{V})	1.60

Details
Mass	1.54 M_{☉}
Radius	7.3 R_{☉}
Luminosity	24 L_{☉}
Surface gravity (log g)	3.09 cgs
Temperature	4,941 K
Metallicity [Fe/H]	−0.16±0.08 dex
Rotational velocity (v sin i)	2.15 km/s

Other designations
- υ^{1} Eridani, υ^{1} Eri, 50 Eridani, CD−30°1883, HD 29085, HIP 21248, HR 1453, SAO 169570

Database references
SIMBAD	data

Upsilon^{1} Eridani (υ^{1} Eri) is a single star in the constellation Eridanus. It has an apparent visual magnitude is 4.51, which is bright enough to be faintly visible to the naked eye on a clear, dark night. The distance to this star, as determined using the parallax method, is around 127 light years.

This is an evolved red clump giant star with a stellar classification of K0III-IV. The measured angular diameter, after correction for limb darkening, is 1.74±0.02 mas. At an estimated distance of this star, this yields a physical size of about 7.3 times the radius of the Sun. It has 154% of the Sun's mass and radiates 24 times the solar luminosity from its outer atmosphere at an effective temperature of 4,941 K.
