= F Eridani =

Multiple star system in the constellation Eridanus

f Eridani
- Location of f Eridani (circled)

Observation data Epoch J2000 Equinox ICRS
- Constellation: Eridanus
- HD 24072
- Right ascension: 03^{h} 48^{m} 35.87402^{s}
- Declination: −37° 37′ 12.5158″
- Apparent magnitude (V): 4.721±0.009
- HD 24071
- Right ascension: 03^{h} 48^{m} 35.47769^{s}
- Declination: −37° 37′ 19.2124″
- Apparent magnitude (V): 5.246±0.009

Characteristics

HD 24072
- Evolutionary stage: main sequence
- Spectral type: B9.5 Van

HD 24071
- Evolutionary stage: main sequence
- Spectral type: A1 Va
- Variable type: suspected

Astrometry

HD 24072
Proper motion (μ)	RA: +81.136 mas/yr Dec.: −6.795 mas/yr
Parallax (π)	18.8093±0.2220 mas
Distance	173 ± 2 ly (53.2 ± 0.6 pc)
Absolute magnitude (M_{V})	1.194±0.190

HD 24071
Proper motion (μ)	RA: +63.372 mas/yr Dec.: −8.121 mas/yr
Parallax (π)	18.7976±0.0582 mas
Distance	173.5 ± 0.5 ly (53.2 ± 0.2 pc)
Absolute magnitude (M_{V})	1.719±0.190

Details

HD 24072
Mass	2.6 M_{☉}
Radius	2.0 R_{☉}
Luminosity	35 L_{☉}
Surface gravity (log g)	4.26 cgs
Temperature	10,046 K
Metallicity [Fe/H]	−0.49 dex
Rotational velocity (v sin i)	225 km/s
Age	45±4 Myr

HD 24071
Mass	2.1 M_{☉}
Radius	1.7 R_{☉}
Luminosity	20 L_{☉}
Surface gravity (log g)	4.16 cgs
Temperature	9,503 K
Metallicity [Fe/H]	−0.54 dex
Rotational velocity (v sin i)	39 km/s
Age	45±4 Myr

Other designations
- f Eridani, CD−38 1297, HIP 17797, WDS J03486-3737
- A: HD 24072, HR 1190, SAO 194551
- B: HD 24071, HR 1189, SAO 194550

Database references
SIMBAD	data
- HD 24072
- HD 24071

f Eridani is a binary, or possibly a triple, star system in the equatorial constellation of Eridanus, consisting of stars HD 24071 and HD 24072. They share a single Hipparcos catalogue entry, HIP 17797, but have separate Bright Star Catalogue listings, HR 1189 and 1190. f Eridani is the Bayer designation of the pair.

f Eridani is visible to the naked eye as a single star with a magnitude of 4.25. HD 24071 has an apparent visual magnitude of 5.25 and HD 24072 a magnitude of 4.72. As of 2009, the pair had an angular separation of 8.40″ along a position angle of 216°. Both stars have an annual parallax shift 18.8 mas, which provides a distance estimate to the system of 173 light years. The pair are members of the Tucana-Horologium moving group, a 45 million year old set of stars that share a common motion through space.

The brighter component, HD 24072, is a B-type main-sequence star with a classification of B9.5 Van. The n suffix indicates "nebulous" absorption lines which are caused by its rapid rotation. It has a projected rotational velocity of 225 km/s.

HD 24071 may itself be a spectroscopic binary. The visible component is an A-type main-sequence star with a stellar classification of A1 Va. It is a suspected variable star of unknown type showing an amplitude of 0.05 magnitude, and is a source of X-ray emission, which may originate from a companion of class G2-5V.
