= Upsilon4 Eridani =

Star in the constellation Eridanus

Upsilon^{4} Eridani
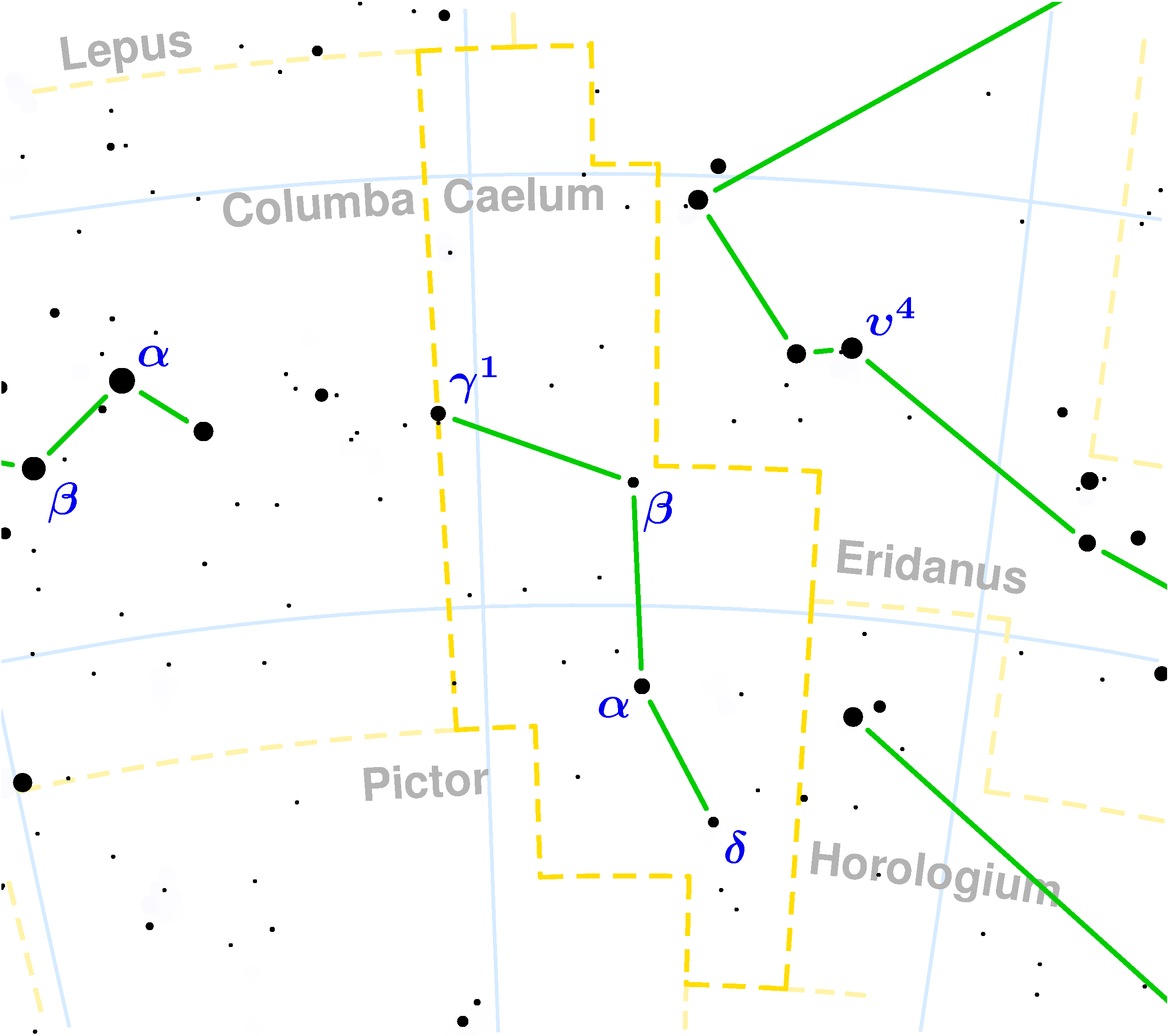
- Location of Upsilon^{4} in Eridanus (circled), centred on the constellation of Caelum.

Observation data Epoch J2000.0 Equinox J2000.0 (ICRS)
- Constellation: Eridanus
- Right ascension: 04^{h} 17^{m} 53.66241^{s}
- Declination: −33° 47′ 54.0569″
- Apparent magnitude (V): 3.56

Characteristics
- Spectral type: B8V + B9.5V
- U−B color index: −0.36
- B−V color index: −0.12

Astrometry
Radial velocity (R_{v})	+17.6 km/s
Proper motion (μ)	RA: +62.52 mas/yr Dec.: −7.24 mas/yr
Parallax (π)	18.33±0.15 mas
Distance	178 ± 1 ly (54.6 ± 0.4 pc)
Absolute magnitude (M_{V})	−0.20

Orbit
Period (P)	5.0103250±0.0000008 d
Semi-major axis (a)	1.902±0.006 mas
Eccentricity (e)	0
Inclination (i)	146.2±0.1°
Periastron epoch (T)	2454407.7214 ± 0.002 JD
Semi-amplitude (K_{1}) (primary)	62.68±0.17 km/s
Semi-amplitude (K_{2}) (secondary)	64.70±0.15 km/s

Details

υ^{4} Eri A
Mass	3.17±0.07 M_{☉}
Radius	2.32±0.18 R_{☉}
Luminosity	100.6±4.3 L_{☉}
Surface gravity (log g)	4.21±0.07 cgs
Temperature	12,930±440 K
Rotational velocity (v sin i)	19 km/s
Age	146 Myr

υ^{4} Eri B
Mass	3.07±0.07 M_{☉}
Radius	2.32±0.18 R_{☉}
Luminosity	87.4±3.3 L_{☉}
Surface gravity (log g)	4.21±0.07 cgs
Temperature	12,250 K

Other designations
- υ^{4} Eri, 41 Eridani, CD−34°1614, HD 27376, HIP 20042, HR 1347, SAO 194902

Database references
SIMBAD	data

Upsilon^{4} Eridani is a close binary star system in the constellation Eridanus. It is visible to the naked eye with an apparent visual magnitude of 3.56. Based upon parallax measurements, the pair are located around 54.6 parsecs (178 ly) from the Sun.

This is a double-lined spectroscopic binary star system, which means that the Doppler-shifted spectral lines of both components can be distinguished. The pair have a circular orbit with a period of five days. The system is composed of two B-type main-sequence stars: one has a stellar classification of B8V and the other B9.5V. Both stars show HgMn peculiarities in their spectrum, and their properties are nearly identical. The spin rate of the two stars is synchronized to their orbital period. It is possible that a nearby K-type star is also related.
