= LN Andromedae =

Star in the constellation Andromeda

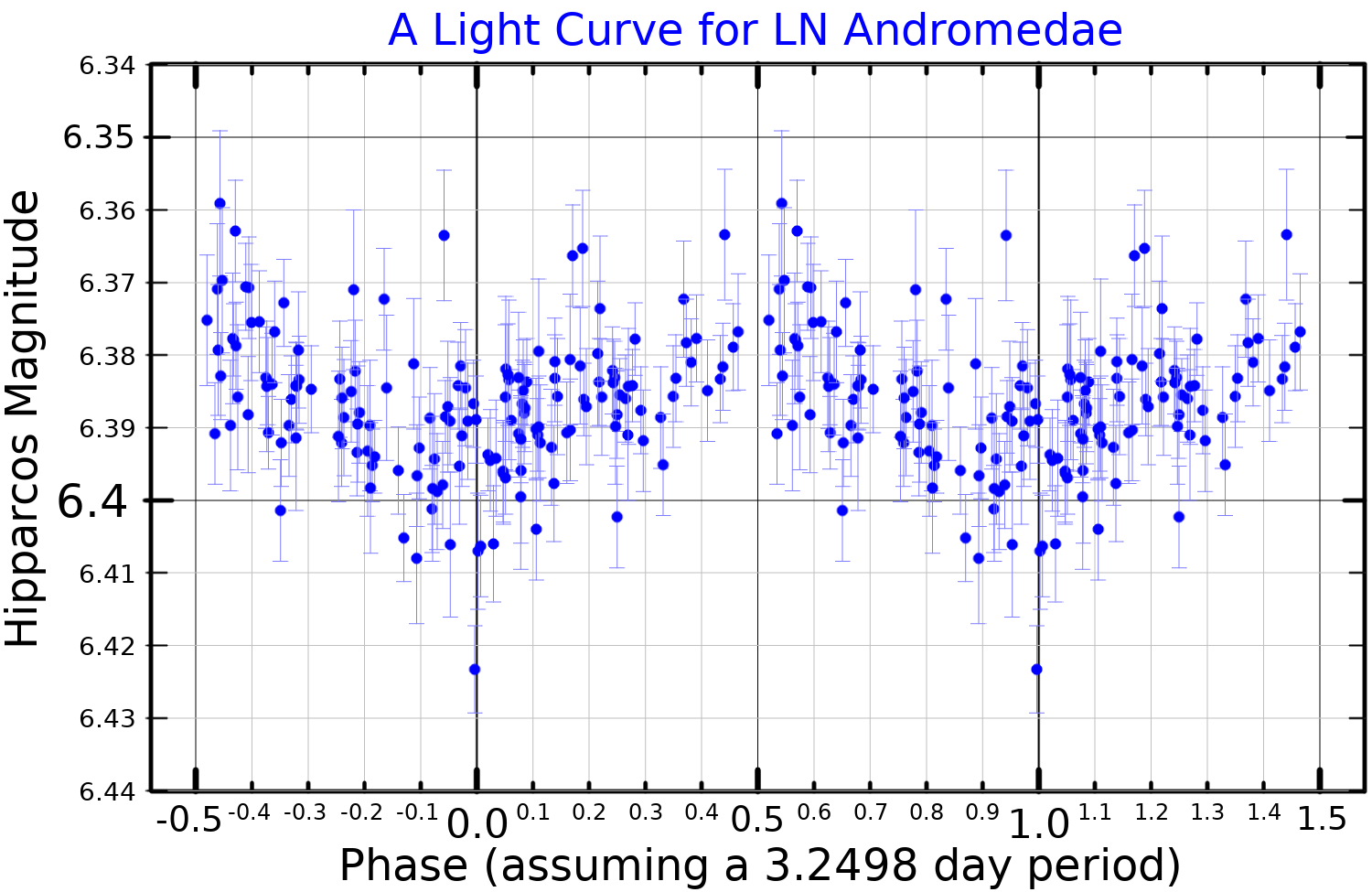
- A light curve for LN Andromedae, plotted from Hipparcos data

Observation data Epoch J2000.0 Equinox ICRS
- Constellation: Andromeda
- LN Andromedae A
- Right ascension: 23^{h} 02^{m} 45.14786^{s}
- Declination: +44° 03′ 31.4984″
- Apparent magnitude (V): 6.37
- LN Andromedae B
- Right ascension: 23^{h} 02^{m} 45.60328^{s}
- Declination: +44° 03′ 37.2673″
- Apparent magnitude (V): 9.88

Characteristics

A
- Spectral type: B2V
- Apparent magnitude (U): 5.8
- Apparent magnitude (B): 6.377
- Apparent magnitude (J): 6.368
- Apparent magnitude (H): 6.482
- Apparent magnitude (K): 6.496
- Variable type: SPB?

B
- Spectral type: A1V

Astrometry

LN Andromedae A
Radial velocity (R_{v})	−11.30±0.1 km/s
Proper motion (μ)	RA: 0.441±0.019 mas/yr Dec.: −5.799±0.027 mas/yr
Parallax (π)	2.1847±0.0280 mas
Distance	1,490 ± 20 ly (458 ± 6 pc)
Absolute magnitude (M_{V})	−1.66

LN Andromedae B
Proper motion (μ)	RA: 0.238±0.012 mas/yr Dec.: −5.813±0.016 mas/yr
Parallax (π)	2.2005±0.0182 mas
Distance	1,480 ± 10 ly (454 ± 4 pc)

Details

A
Mass	6.5 M_{☉}
Radius	3.1 R_{☉}
Luminosity	608 L_{☉}
Surface gravity (log g)	3.94±0.13 cgs
Temperature	18090±730 K
Metallicity [Fe/H]	−0.23 dex
Rotational velocity (v sin i)	8±4 km/s
Age	9.5±4.8 Myr

B
Mass	2.1 M_{☉}
Radius	2.0 R_{☉}
Luminosity	13 L_{☉}
Surface gravity (log g)	4.1 cgs
Temperature	9,843 K
Metallicity [Fe/H]	−0.33 dex

Other designations
- 2MASS J23024514+4403314, HR 8768, BD+43°4378, HD 217811, SAO 52626, PPM 63745, HIP 113802, WDS J23028+4404AB

Database references
SIMBAD	data

LN Andromedae (LN And), also known as HD 217811, HR 8768, is a formerly suspected variable star in the constellation Andromeda. Located approximately 458 parsecs (1,490 ly) away from Earth, it shines with an apparent visual magnitude 6.41, thus it can be seen by the naked eye under very favourable conditions. Its spectral classification is B2V, meaning that it is a hot main sequence star, emitting light approximately with a blackbody spectrum at an effective temperature of 18,090 K.

== Companion ==
In the Washington Double Star Catalog LN And has a faint optical companion star with an apparent magnitude of 9.88, 7.5″ from LN And. The separation has increased from 4.0″ when it was discovered as a double in 1828. The two stars share the same Hipparcos identifier HIP 113802, and have very similar parallaxes and proper motions.

== Variability ==
In 1979, the blue magnitude of LN And was reported to vary by about 0.025 every 28 minutes. Such variability was not known for any class of variable, but the position in the Hertzsprung–Russell diagram at the main sequence (low luminosity) end of the same instability strip as the β Cephei stars would make high-overtone radial pulsations the likely cause. LN And was added to the General Catalogue of Variable Stars as LN Andromedae, but follow-up studies failed to find the same rapid variations, or any significant variations in brightness and it is now listed as probably constant.

Analysis of Hipparcos photometry shows variability of about 0.0059 magnitudes with a main period of 3.25 d. The statistical threshold for these variations is at a level which is only met by 0.01% of stars.
