= HD 118508 =

Star in the constellation Boötes

Observation data Epoch J2000 Equinox ICRS
- Constellation: Boötes
- Right ascension: 13^{h} 36^{m} 59.08233^{s}
- Declination: +24° 36′ 47.8687″
- Apparent magnitude (V): 5.8

Characteristics
- Evolutionary stage: AGB
- Spectral type: M2III
- U−B color index: +1.85
- B−V color index: +1.58
- Variable type: suspected

Astrometry
Radial velocity (R_{v})	−35.69±0.18 km/s
Proper motion (μ)	RA: −26.654 mas/yr Dec.: −2.803 mas/yr
Parallax (π)	5.9122±0.0860 mas
Distance	552 ± 8 ly (169 ± 2 pc)
Absolute magnitude (M_{V})	−0.431

Details
Mass	1.1 M_{☉}
Radius	49 R_{☉}
Luminosity	324 L_{☉}
Surface gravity (log g)	1.04 cgs
Temperature	3,594 K
Metallicity [Fe/H]	+0.44 dex

Other designations
- BD+25 2652, FK5 3085, HD 118508, HIP 66417, HR 5123, SAO 82905, NSV 6342

Database references
SIMBAD	data

HD 118508 is a suspected variable star in the northern constellation of Boötes. Its apparent magnitude may vary with an amplitude of 0.04, discovered during a search for small-amplitude red variables. It is a red giant about 552 light years away.
