= WZ Columbae =

Star in the constellation of Columba

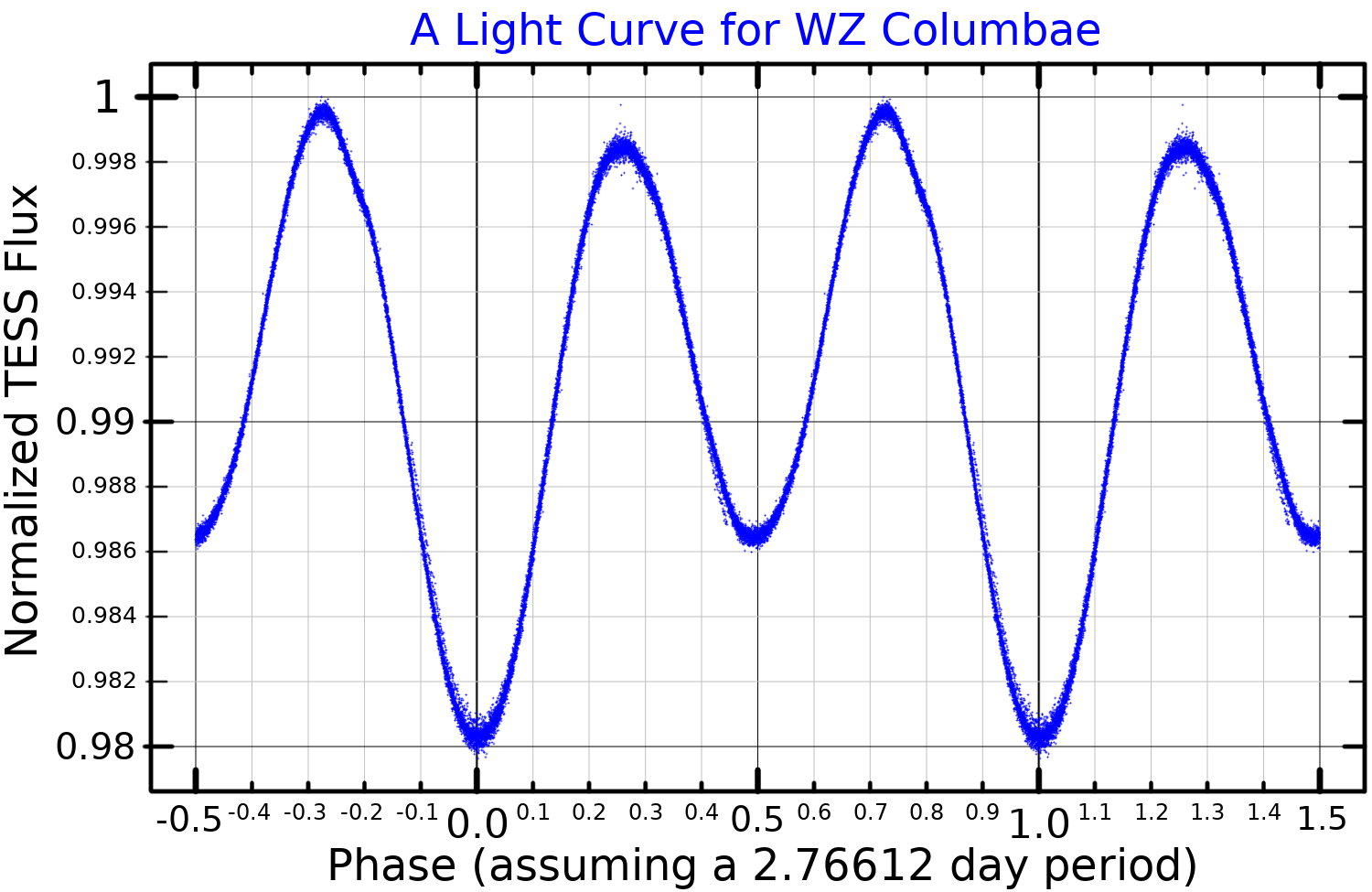
- A light curve for WZ Columbae, plotted from TESS data

Observation data Epoch J2000.0 Equinox J2000.0 (ICRS)
- Constellation: Columba
- Right ascension: 05^{h} 42^{m} 15.19447^{s}
- Declination: −34° 40′ 04.1399″
- Apparent magnitude (V): 5.28±0.01

Characteristics
- Evolutionary stage: main sequence
- Spectral type: B9/9.5 V
- B−V color index: −0.05
- Variable type: SPB or α^{2} CVn

Astrometry
Radial velocity (R_{v})	36.3±0.6 km/s
Proper motion (μ)	RA: +5.081 mas/yr Dec.: +51.365 mas/yr
Parallax (π)	8.929±0.08896 mas
Distance	365 ± 4 ly (112 ± 1 pc)
Absolute magnitude (M_{V})	−0.3

Details
Mass	3.07±0.05 M_{☉}
Radius	3.47 R_{☉}
Luminosity	124 L_{☉}
Surface gravity (log g)	3.79±0.07 cgs
Temperature	10,000^{+256}_{−250} K
Metallicity [Fe/H]	+0.51 dex
Rotational velocity (v sin i)	65±5 km/s
Age	394^{+10}_{−17} Myr

Other designations
- 42 G. Columbae, WZ Col, CD−34°2401, CPD−34°711, GC 7150, HD 38170, HIP 26868, HR 1973, SAO 196098

Database references
SIMBAD	data

WZ Columbae, also known as HD 38170, is a solitary, bluish-white hued star located in the southern constellation Columba, the dove. It has an apparent magnitude of 5.28, allowing it to be faintly visible to the naked eye. Based on parallax measurements from the Gaia spacecraft, the object is about 365 light years distant. It appears to be receding from the Solar System, having a heliocentric radial velocity of 36.3 km/s.

The star was discovered to be a variable star when the Hipparcos data was analyzed. It was given its variable star designation in 1999. WZ Columbae was originally listed as a slowly pulsating B-type star by the General Catalogue of Variable Stars. However, observations from Hempel & Howlger (2003) reveal it to be overabundant in strontium and barium. Combined with Hipparcos photometry, this led to the object being reclassified as an Alpha2 Canum Venaticorum variable. Based on data collected in the Hipparcos passband, it fluctuates between magnitudes 5.27 and 5.29 over 1.38 days. However, TESS data suggests a period of 2.76618±0.00004 days; double that of the earlier data.

The stellar classification of WZ Columbae is B9/9.5 V — a main-sequence star with the characteristics of a B9 and B9.5 star. It has 3.07 times the mass of the Sun and is estimated to be 394 million years old, having completed 89.2% of its main sequence lifetime. It has a slightly enlarged radius of 3.47 R_{☉} and an effective temperature of 10,000 K. This yields a luminosity 124 times that of the Sun from its photosphere. Like most chemically peculiar stars, WZ Columbae has a relatively slow projected rotational velocity at 65 km/s.
