= HR 3600 =

Variable star in constellation Vela

- Location of HR 3600 (circled)

Observation data Epoch J2000 Equinox ICRS
- Constellation: Vela
- Right ascension: 09^{h} 01^{m} 20.86511^{s}
- Declination: −41° 51′ 51.3343″
- Apparent magnitude (V): +5.541

Characteristics

HR 3600
- Evolutionary stage: main sequence
- Spectral type: B5V
- U−B color index: −0.56
- B−V color index: −0.133
- J−H color index: −0.106
- J−K color index: −0.106
- Variable type: Slowly pulsating B-type star?

Astrometry
Radial velocity (R_{v})	22.8±1.2 km/s
Proper motion (μ)	RA: −22.727 mas/yr Dec.: +12.139 mas/yr
Parallax (π)	6.6050±0.0711 mas
Distance	494 ± 5 ly (151 ± 2 pc)
Absolute magnitude (M_{V})	−0.71
Absolute bolometric magnitude (M_{bol})	−2.08

Details
Mass	3.999±0.200 M_{☉}
Radius	3.222±0.161 R_{☉}
Luminosity	535 L_{☉}
Surface gravity (log g)	4.30 cgs
Temperature	14,966 K
Rotational velocity (v sin i)	50 km/s

Other designations
- IZ Velorum, CD−41°4720, CPD−41°3232, GC 12489, HD 77475, HIP 44299, HR 3600, SAO 220760, PPM 313879, WDS J08553-4503A, TIC 191446158, TYC 7685-2721-1, GSC 07685-02721, 2MASS J09012085-4151513, Gaia DR3 5428323854487771392

Database references
SIMBAD	data

HR 3600 (HD 77475) is a bluish-white hued variable star in the southern constellation of Vela. It has the variable-star designation IZ Velorum (abbreviated to IZ Vel). With an apparent magnitude of about 5.54, it is faintly visible to the naked eye under dark skies. It is located approximately 494 light-years (151 parsecs) distant according to Gaia DR3 parallax measurements, and is receding from the Solar System at a heliocentric radial velocity of 22.8 km/s.

== Physical properties ==
This is a hot, luminous B-type main-sequence star with a mass of 4.0 M_{☉} and a radius of 3.2 R_{☉}. With an effective temperature of 14,966 K (26,479 °F), it shines at an absolute bolometric magnitude of −2.08, meaning it radiates 535 L_{☉} from its photosphere; and an absolute visual magnitude of −0.71, that is 151 L_{☉} released in the visual (V) band of the UBV photometric system.

This star was initially given the stellar classification B5III in 1978, indicative of a blue giant, but was reclassified as a main-sequence star of the same spectral type by Burki et al. (1982) due to similarities to other stars such as 32 Orionis, Lambda Columbae, HW Velorum, and HD 186837, all of type B5V. They simultaneously reported that it was a slowly pulsating B-type star (SPB) with three tentative periods of 9.64 days, 14.4 days, and 10.7 days, all of them with amplitudes of several mmag that produce a combined peak-to-peak amplitude of roughly 0.03 mag.

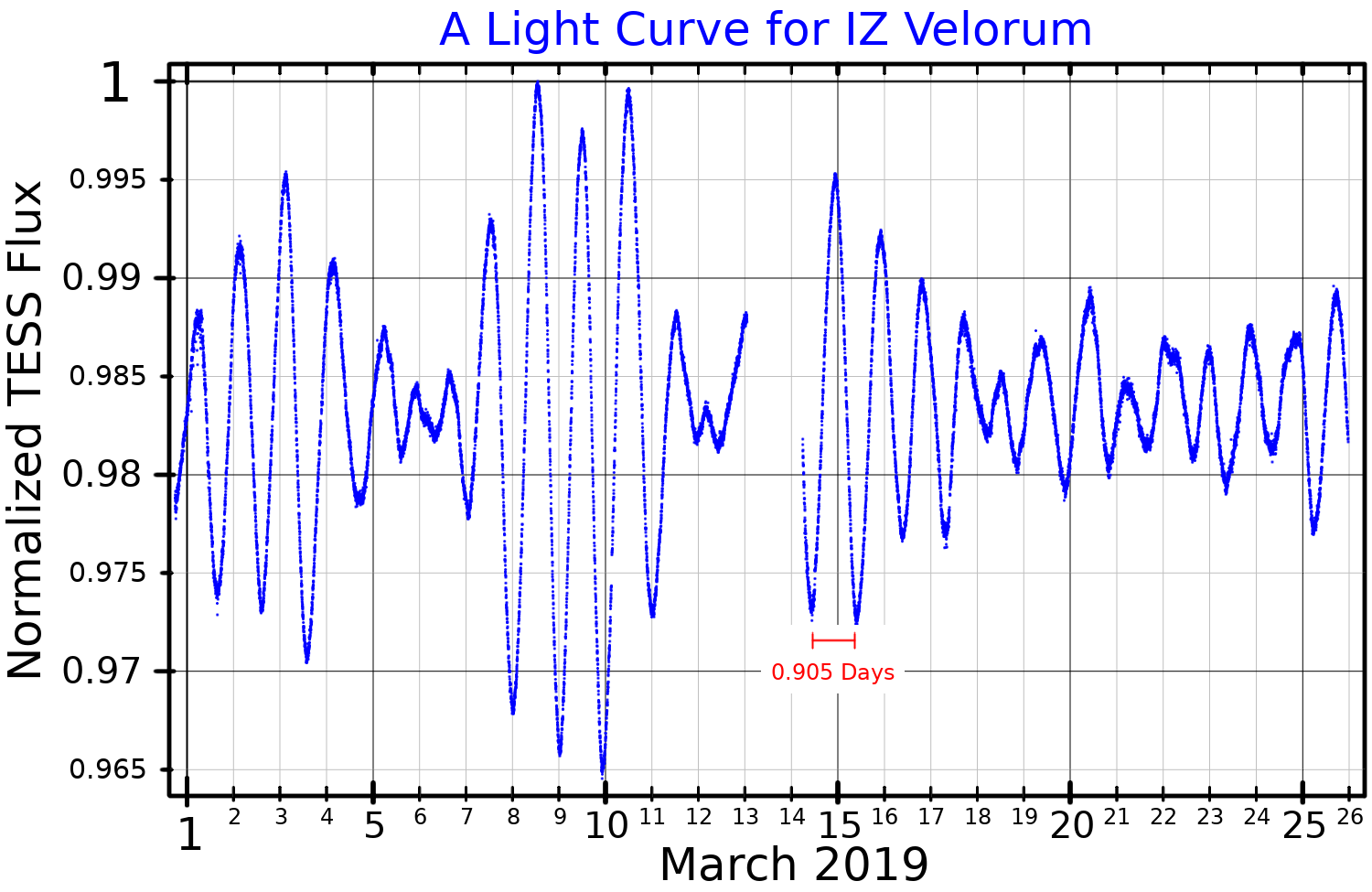
A light curve for IZ Velorum, plotted from TESS data. The 0.905 day period derived by Balona is marked in red.

In 1986, Balona & Laing stated that HR 3600 in fact only had a single period of 1.10 days, an alias of the 9.64-day period presented by Burki et al. Citing the variable radial velocity of the star (20–30 km/s) and the low projected rotational velocity (50 km/s), they argued that it was more likely a rotating ellipsoidal variable, in which case the system would consist of a close binary orbiting each other every 2.20 days. In 1994, Balona, who continued to observe the variable, revised the period to 0.905 days (or possibly 1.81 days), which was another alias of the 9.64-day period. The 14.4-day period could not be detected. The low rotational velocity contradicts the hypotheses that the variability is caused by either binarity or rotational modulation, so the exact nature of this star has yet to be determined.
