= HD 1976 =

Triple star system in the constellation Cassiopeia

- Location of HD 1976 (circled)

Observation data Epoch J2000 Equinox ICRS
- Constellation: Cassiopeia
- Right ascension: 00^{h} 24^{m} 15.65400^{s}
- Declination: +52° 01′ 11.7032″
- Apparent magnitude (V): 5.580 (combined)

Characteristics
- Spectral type: (B5IV + unknown) + ~B5-6IV
- U−B color index: −0.619
- B−V color index: −0.121
- J−H color index: −0.102
- J−K color index: −0.106
- Variable type: Slowly pulsating B-type star (A; disputed)

Astrometry
Radial velocity (R_{v})	−9.70±0.49 km/s
Proper motion (μ)	RA: 15.504 mas/yr Dec.: −4.061 mas/yr
Parallax (π)	2.4621±0.33 mas
Distance	approx. 1,300 ly (approx. 410 pc)
Absolute magnitude (M_{V})	−1.76

Orbit
Primary	HD 1976 Aa
Name	HD 1976 Ab
Period (P)	25.4163±0.0008 d
Semi-major axis (a)	0.42±0.05 mas
Eccentricity (e)	0.05±0.03
Inclination (i)	100.7±1.2°
Longitude of the node (Ω)	339.9±1.1°
Periastron epoch (T)	59477±5
Argument of periastron (ω) (secondary)	61±52°

Orbit
Primary	HD 1976 A
Name	HD 1976 B
Period (P)	171±3 yr
Semi-major axis (a)	208.0±2.7 mas
Eccentricity (e)	0.162±0.008
Inclination (i)	62.8±0.4°
Longitude of the node (Ω)	27.8±0.4°
Periastron epoch (T)	33710±679
Argument of periastron (ω) (secondary)	306.0±4°

Details

HD 1976 Aa
Mass	6.45±0.17, 6.348 M_{☉}
Radius	5.24+0.14 −0.10 R_{☉}
Surface gravity (log g)	3.81±0.01 cgs
Temperature	16526+100 −82 K
Rotational velocity (v sin i)	170±4 km/s
Age	~60 Myr

HD 1976 Ab
Mass	1.83, 4.0±0.7 M_{☉}
Radius	1.83 R_{☉}
Surface gravity (log g)	4.18 cgs
Temperature	8071+266 −352 K
Rotational velocity (v sin i)	165 km/s

HD 1976 B
Mass	6.10+0.27 −0.26 M_{☉}
Radius	4.48±0.20 R_{☉}
Surface gravity (log g)	3.92±0.02 cgs
Temperature	13620+154 −144 K
Rotational velocity (v sin i)	73+6 −5 km/s

Other designations
- V746 Cassiopeiae, AG+51°39, BD+51°62, GC 476, HD 1976, HIP 1921, HR 91, SAO 21366, PPM 25297, WDS J00243+5201AB, TIC 202418751, TYC 3260-2342-1, GSC 03260-02342, 2MASS J00241564+5201119, Gaia DR3 418916648901801728, ADS 328

Database references
SIMBAD	HD 1976

HD 1976 is a hierarchical triple system in the deep northern constellation of Cassiopeia, somewhere around 1,100 light-years (340 parsecs) from Earth. It has the variable-star designation V746 Cassiopeiae (abbreviated to V746 Cas). The system is faintly visible to the naked eye under dark skies, having an apparent magnitude of 5.580. It consists of an inner pair between a B-type subgiant and a less massive unknown-type star, which is distantly orbited by another B-type subgiant. It is currently moving closer towards the Solar System at a heliocentric radial velocity of −9.70 km/s.

== Measurement discrepancies ==
Several measurements have been made on the distance to the star system, namely 406±54 pc, 307±59 pc, and 186±24 pc, but all of them have large errors and differ substantially from one another. The first two agree within the wide error bars, while the third value is thought to be too low due to the noisy radial velocity orbit swaying the semi-amplitude. In a 2022 study, the total mass of the inner pair could only be constrained poorly at 9±5 M_{☉} because of this uncertainty, and the masses of the individual stars were estimated from a mass ratio of 1.57±0.28 and an adopted (Note: From Kervella et al. 2019.) mass figure of 6.348 M_{☉}.

Stellar parameter estimates via astronomical spectroscopy also yield different results depending on whether the spectral data near the Balmer lines H-β, H-γ, and H-δ is included in calculations, which are often affected by instrumental problems and rectification systematics.

== Stellar components ==
=== HD 1976 Aa ===
HD 1976 Aa is a B-type subgiant star with a spectral type of B5IV. It is thought to be very young, at only about 60 million years old, a little over one-eightieth the age of the Sun (4.6 Gyr). It emits 70% of the total light from the system. Two solutions exist on its mass, namely 4.71 and 6.45 M_{☉}. The latter, deduced excluding data near the Balmer lines, seems to agree better with the newer 2019 estimate of 6.348 M_{☉}.

The Aa/Ab pair is part of an SB2 spectroscopic binary with HD 1976 B, denoting that the spectral lines from both components (A, B) are visible, and is itself an SB1 spectroscopic binary, meaning that only Aa's spectral lines are visible.

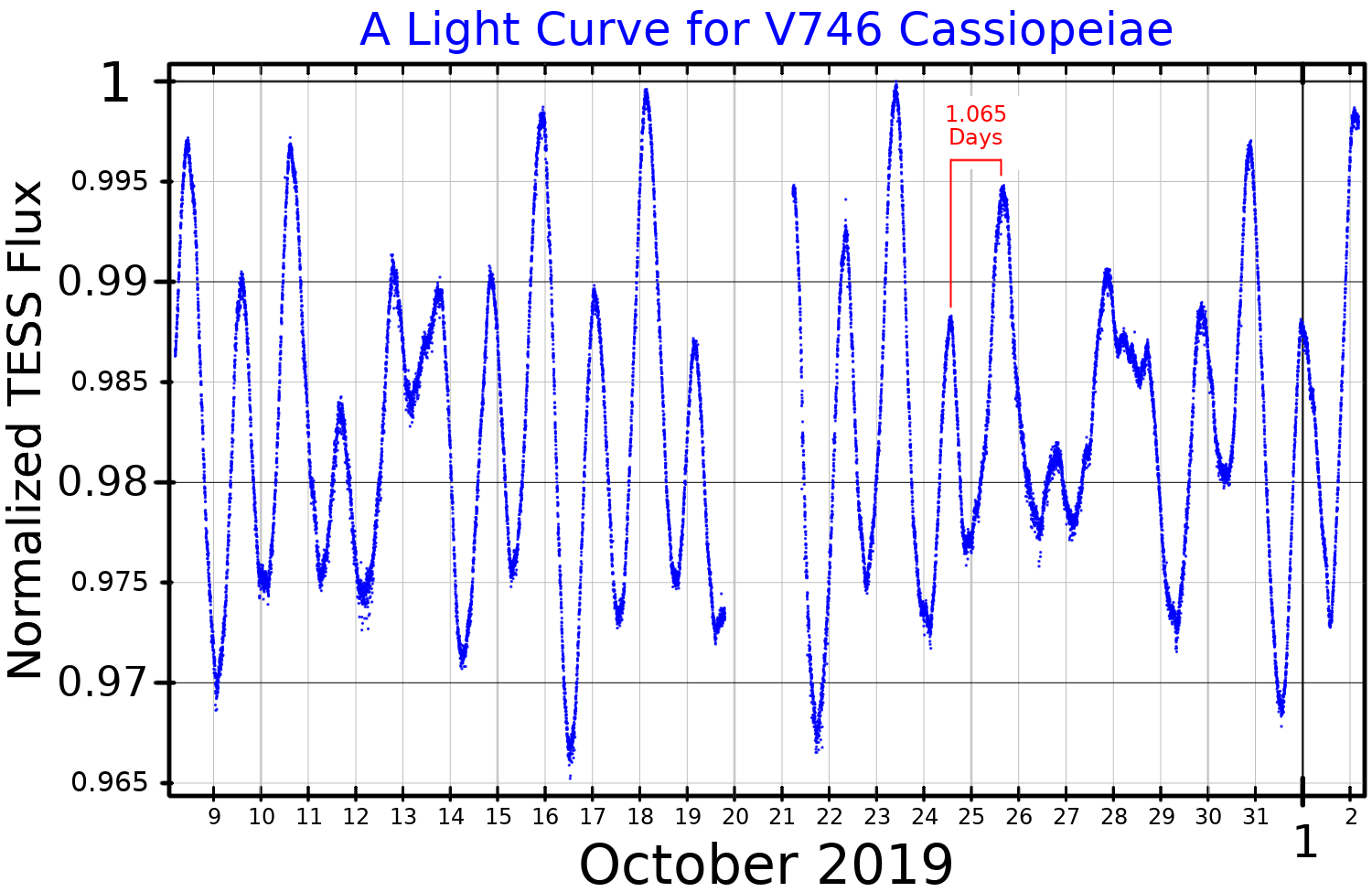
A light curve for V746 Cassiopeiae, plotted from TESS data. One of the dominant periods, 1.065 days, is marked in red.

HD 1976 was found to be a variable star when the Hipparcos data was analyzed. It was given its variable star designation in 1999. The star was reported to show multiperiodic pulsations with periods ranging between 0.83 and 2.50 days. As such, the star was classified as a slowly pulsating B-type star (SPB). However, a 2017 study identified the two dominant photometric periods (2.503867 and 1.0649524 days) as the rotation periods of the tertiary and primary stars (albeit the latter is tentative), which, if confirmed, would throw the SPB classification into question.

In 2014, it was announced that the star possessed a strong magnetic field, detected through spectropolarimetric observations, though the magnetic field is now thought to belong to the third star (B) instead.

=== HD 1976 Ab ===
The only component whose spectrum cannot be directly observed, HD 1976 Ab is in a nearly circular (eccentricity 0.05) 25-day orbit with Aa. Radial velocity variations caused by the star were observed as far back as 1912, and its orbital parameters were first determined in 1963.

As is the case with the other two stars, its physical properties are very uncertain. A 2017 study presented two sets of possible characteristics, each corresponding to an A-type (1.87 M_{☉}) and F-type main-sequence star (1.31 M_{☉}). In 2022, however, a far higher mass of 4.0±0.7 M_{☉} was reported, which resembles that of a late B-type main-sequence star. (Note: In comparison, a typical B7V star has a mass of about 3.92 M_{☉}.)

=== HD 1976 B ===
HD 1976 B is a B-type subgiant much like HD 1976 Aa but slightly less luminous, radiating about 30% of the total light from the system. It distantly orbits the inner Aa/Ab pair at a period of about 170 years. Its orbit was first determined in 1986, though at the time the period was underestimated at 104 years. The mass estimate differs significantly depending on the aforementioned inclusion of the Balmer lines: 2.65 M_{☉} if included and 6.10 M_{☉} if not. The star has a strong bipolar magnetic field that varies with a period of 2.504 days, which is most likely its rotational period.

== See also ==
- HD 25558
