= Slowly pulsating B-type star =

Type of star

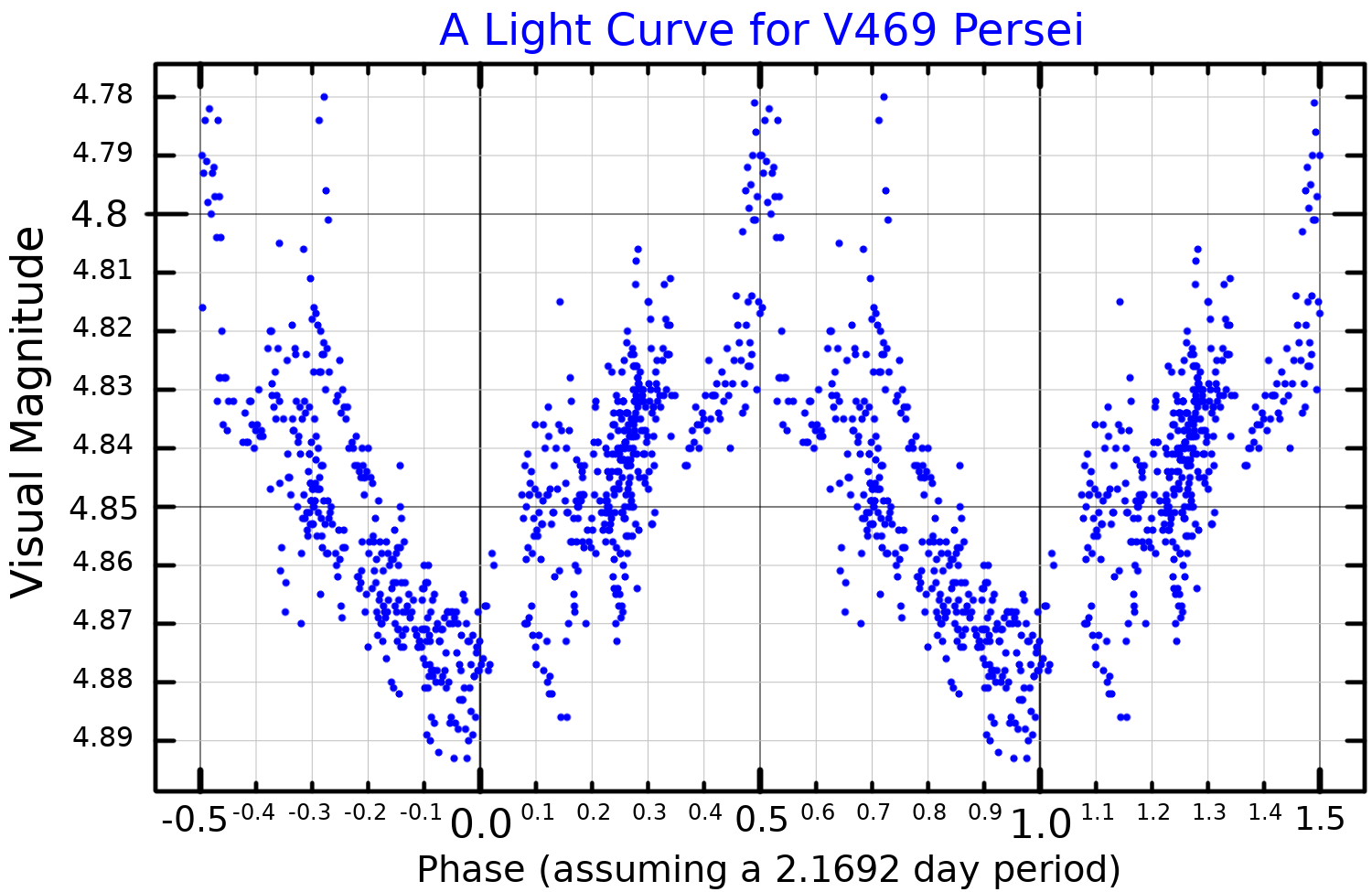
A visual band light curve for V469 Persei (53 Persei), plotted from data published by Huang et al. (1994). This star was the prototype for this class of variable stars.

A slowly pulsating B-type star (SPB), formerly known as a 53 Persei variable, is a type of pulsating variable star. They may also be termed a long-period pulsating B star (LPB). As the name implies, they are main-sequence stars of spectral type B2 to B9 (3 to 9 times as massive as the Sun) that pulsate with periods between approximately half a day and five days, however within this most member stars have been found to have multiple periods of oscillations. They display variability both in their light emission and in their spectral line profile. The variations in magnitude are generally smaller than 0.1 magnitudes, making it quite hard to observe variability with the naked eye in most cases. The variability increases with decreasing wavelength, thus they are more obviously variable in ultraviolet spectrum than visible light. Their pulsations are non-radial, that is, they vary in shape rather than volume; different parts of the star are expanding and contracting simultaneously.

These stars were first identified as a group and named by astronomers Christoffel Waelkens and Fredy Rufener in 1985 while looking for and analysing variability in hot blue stars. Improvements in photometry had made finding smaller changes in magnitude easier, and they had found that a high percentage of hot stars were intrinsically variable. They referred to them as 53 Persei stars after the prototype 53 Persei. Ten had been discovered by 1993, though Waelkens was unsure if the prototype was actually a member and recommended referring to the group as slowly pulsating B (SPB) stars. The General Catalogue of Variable Stars uses the acronym LPB for "comparatively long-period pulsating B stars (periods exceeding one day)", although this terminology is rarely seen elsewhere.

The similar Beta Cephei variables have shorter periods and have p-mode pulsations, while the SPB stars show g-mode pulsations. By 2007, 51 SPB stars had been confirmed with another 65 stars possible members. Six stars, namely Iota Herculis, 53 Piscium, Nu Eridani, Gamma Pegasi, HD 13745 (V354 Persei) and 53 Arietis had been found to exhibit both Beta Cephei and SPB variability.

== List ==
The following list contains selected slowly pulsating B-type stars that are of interest to amateur or professional astronomy. Unless otherwise noted, the given magnitudes are in the V-band.

Star	Average magnitude	Spectral type	Period (in days)	Distance (in parsecs)
Gamma Pegasi (Algenib)	2.84	B2IV	(Note: Also a Beta Cephei variable)	113
Zeta Pegasi (Homam)	3.41	B8V	0.96	63
Omicron Velorum	3.63	B3IV	2.80	151
Iota Herculis (Tianbang)	3.80	B3IV	3.49	139
Gamma Muscae	3.88	B3V	2.73	100
Tau Herculis (Asuusiha)	3.90	B5IV	1.25	94
Nu Eridani	3.92	B2III		207
Mu Eridani	4.00	B5IV	(Note: Also an Algol variable)	160
Rho Lupi	4.05	B5V	0.45	97
HD 105382	4.47	B6IIIe	1.30	134
Tau^{8} Eridani	4.63	B5V	0.86	116
Nu Pavonis	4.64	B7III	0.86	135
HY Velorum	4.82	B3IV	1.55	148
HD 131120	5.01	B7IIIp	1.57	151
HR 5780	5.17	B5V	1.26	122
3 Vulpeculae	5.19	B6III	1.26	120
12 Lacertae	5.23	B2III		411
WZ Columbae	5.29	B9.5V	1.38	131
V575 Persei	5.30	B5V		166
Xi Octantis	5.31	B6V	1.77	151
HD 25558	5.33	B5V	1.53	196
25 Serpentis	5.39	B8III	0.87	188
GU Eridani	5.43	B5IV	1.87	200
HR 3600	5.54	B5V		132
KL Velorum	5.56	B8	2.91	212
HD 1976	5.58	B5IV	1.06	307
V450 Carinae	5.64	B9III+B8V	1.65	151
EO Leonis	5.66	B2V	2.78	289
V539 Arae	5.71	B2/B3Vnn		303
HD 128207	5.73	B8V	0.48	147
HD 27563	5.84	B5III	3.80	242
26 Canis Majoris	5.90	B2IV/V	2.73	257
16 Monocerotis	5.92	B3V	1.94	263
V335 Velorum	5.93	B.25III	3.76	704
V869 Centauri	5.96	B9IV	1.46	251
V363 Puppis	5.97	B2.5V+B9V	0.70	278
V433 Aurigae	5.99	B2IV-V	4.64	325
V1141 Tauri	6.00	B8IV-V	0.62	170
HD 206540	6.05	B5IV	1.39	215
HR 1397	6.07	B6IV	1.26	198
V576 Persei	6.09	B7V	0.84	159
V2100 Cygni	6.11	B5III	2.61	239
HR 2517	6.15	B2.5III	2.56	2500
V492 Carinae	6.18	B3V	1.06	370
HR 1328	6.20	B9V	0.38	121
V4199 Sagittarii	6.26	B5III	1.24	240
HR 3562	6.26	B3IV		370
V4198 Sagittarii	6.28	B8V	1.19	186
V377 Lacertae	6.32	B7III	2.62	305
DY Chamaeleontis	6.32	B8IV	0.97	236
HR 2680	6.33	B3V		258
V473 Carinae	6.35	B5V	0.95	218
V405 Lacertae	6.37	B5V	1.02	170
HD 34798	6.39	B5Vs	1.28	263
HD 176582	6.40	B5V	1.58	292
V1377 Orionis	6.41	B3III	1.01	476
HR 8768	6.42	B2V	3.25	326
GY Eridani	6.42	B3V	1.33	220
QZ Velorum	6.49	B1IIIn	1.03	813
V550 Lyrae	6.49	B3V	1.69	379
HD 208727	6.50	B8V	0.32	330
HD 43317	6.61	B3IV		369
23 Sextantis	6.64	B3.2IV		769
HD 33331	6.90	B5III	1.15	296
HD 163868	7.36	B5Ve	(Note: Also a shell star)	588
HD 163899	8.30	B2Ib/II	23.20	
HD 50209	8.36	B9Ve	0.67	694
