= V433 Aurigae =

Star in the constellation Auriga

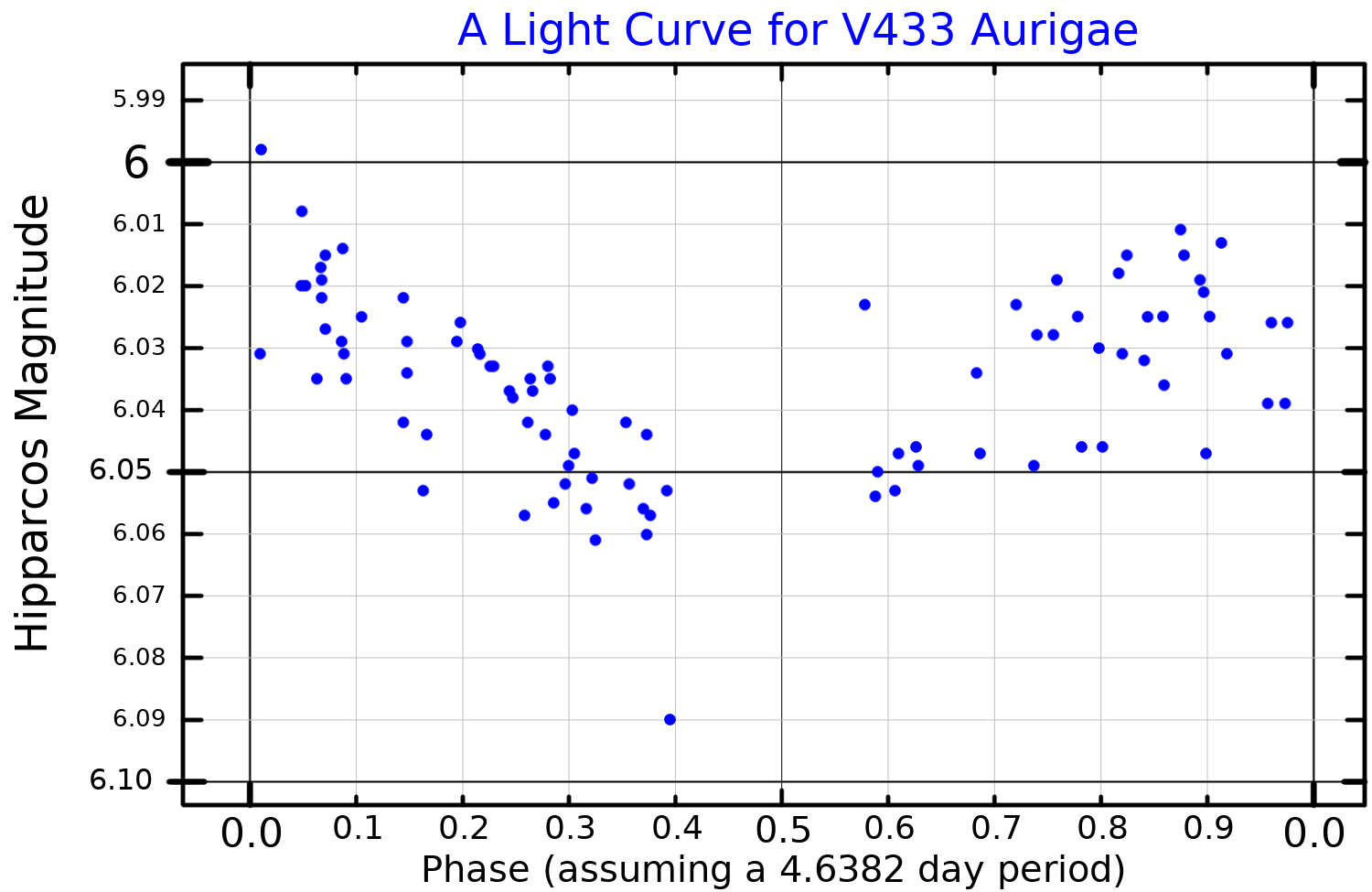
- A light curve for V433 Aurigae, plotted from Hipparcos data

Observation data Epoch J2000 Equinox ICRS
- Constellation: Auriga
- Right ascension: 05^{h} 39^{m} 18.3136^{s}
- Declination: +29° 12′ 54.789″
- Apparent magnitude (V): 6.0

Characteristics
- Spectral type: B2IV-V
- Apparent magnitude (G): 5.91
- U−B color index: −0.5
- B−V color index: +0.16
- Variable type: SPB

Astrometry
Radial velocity (R_{v})	+22.9±1.9 km/s
Proper motion (μ)	RA: −3.106±0.138 mas/yr Dec.: −7.262±0.087 mas/yr
Parallax (π)	0.7620±0.1436 mas
Distance	approx. 4,300 ly (approx. 1,300 pc)

Details
Mass	8.7 M_{☉}
Radius	9.8 R_{☉}
Luminosity	14,128 L_{☉}
Surface gravity (log g)	3.24 cgs
Temperature	16,950 K
Rotational velocity (v sin i)	27 km/s
Age	19.8 Myr

Other designations
- BD+29°947, HD 37367, HIP 26606, HR 1924, SAO 77354, Gaia DR3 3442900661273401600

Database references
SIMBAD	data

V433 Aurigae is a variable star in the constellation Auriga. It is a slowly pulsating B star (SPB) that varies by a few hundredths of a magnitude over 4.6 days. It is faintly visible to the naked eye under very good observing conditions. It shines with a luminosity approximately 14,000 times that of the Sun and has a surface temperature of about 16,950 K.

V433 Aurigae was discovered to be a variable star when the Hipparcos data was analyzed. It was given its variable star designation in 1999.
