= HR 3562 =

Visual binary in constellation Vela

- Location of HR 3562 (circled)

Observation data Epoch J2000 Equinox ICRS
- Constellation: Vela
- HR 3562A
- Right ascension: 08^{h} 55^{m} 19.20215^{s}
- Declination: −45° 02′ 30.0241″
- Apparent magnitude (V): +6.26
- HR 3562B
- Right ascension: 08^{h} 55^{m} 21.6^{s}
- Declination: −45° 02′ 52″
- Apparent magnitude (V): +12.639

Characteristics

HR 3562A
- Evolutionary stage: main sequence
- Spectral type: B3IV
- U−B color index: −0.63
- B−V color index: −0.16
- J−H color index: −0.121
- J−K color index: −0.132
- Variable type: Slowly pulsating B-type star

Astrometry

HR 3562A
Radial velocity (R_{v})	22.0±3.3 km/s
Proper motion (μ)	RA: -13.091 mas/yr Dec.: 7.601 mas/yr
Parallax (π)	2.6833±0.0455 mas
Distance	1,220 ± 20 ly (373 ± 6 pc)
Absolute magnitude (M_{V})	−2.55

HR 3562B
Absolute magnitude (M_{V})	5.22

Orbit
Primary	HR 3562A
Name	HR 3562B
Semi-major axis (a)	35.0" (10024 AU)

Details

HR 3562A
Mass	5.644±0.282 M_{☉}
Radius	5.648±0.282 R_{☉}
Luminosity	832 L_{☉}
Surface gravity (log g)	3.67 or 4.01 cgs
Temperature	16,982 K
Rotational velocity (v sin i)	5 km/s
Age	36-38 Myr

HR 3562B
Mass	0.914 M_{☉}
Radius	0.826 R_{☉}
Luminosity	0.65 L_{☉}
Temperature	5,613 K
Age	50-110 Myr

Other designations
- WDS 08553-4503
- HR 3562A: IY Velorum, CD−44°4951, CPD−44°3226, GC 12349, HD 76566, HIP 43807, HR 3562, SAO 220664, PPM 313785, TIC 30125083, TYC 8152-139-1, GSC 08152-00139, 2MASS J08551918-4502298, Gaia DR3 5331355759365786368

Database references
SIMBAD	A
- B

HR 3562 (HD 76566) is a visual binary consisting of a bluish-white hued variable star and a Sun-like secondary star in the southern constellation of Vela. It has the variable-star designation IY Velorum (abbreviated to IY Vel). With an apparent magnitude of 6.26, the brighter primary is near the limit for naked eye visibility. The fainter companion has an apparent magnitude of 12.639 and can be observed with a telescope with an aperture of 76 mm or wider. It is located approximately 373 parsecs (1,220 ly) distant according to Gaia DR3 parallax measurements, and is receding away from the Solar System at a heliocentric radial velocity of 22.0 km/s.

== HR 3562A ==
This is a hot, luminous B-type subgiant (spectral type B3IV) with a mass of 5.644 M_{☉} and a radius of 5.648 R_{☉}. It radiates 832 times the luminosity of the Sun from its photosphere at an effective temperature of 16,982 K (16,709 °C; 30,108 °F), almost three times hotter than the Sun (5,772 K). It is thought to be very young at around 36-38 million years old.

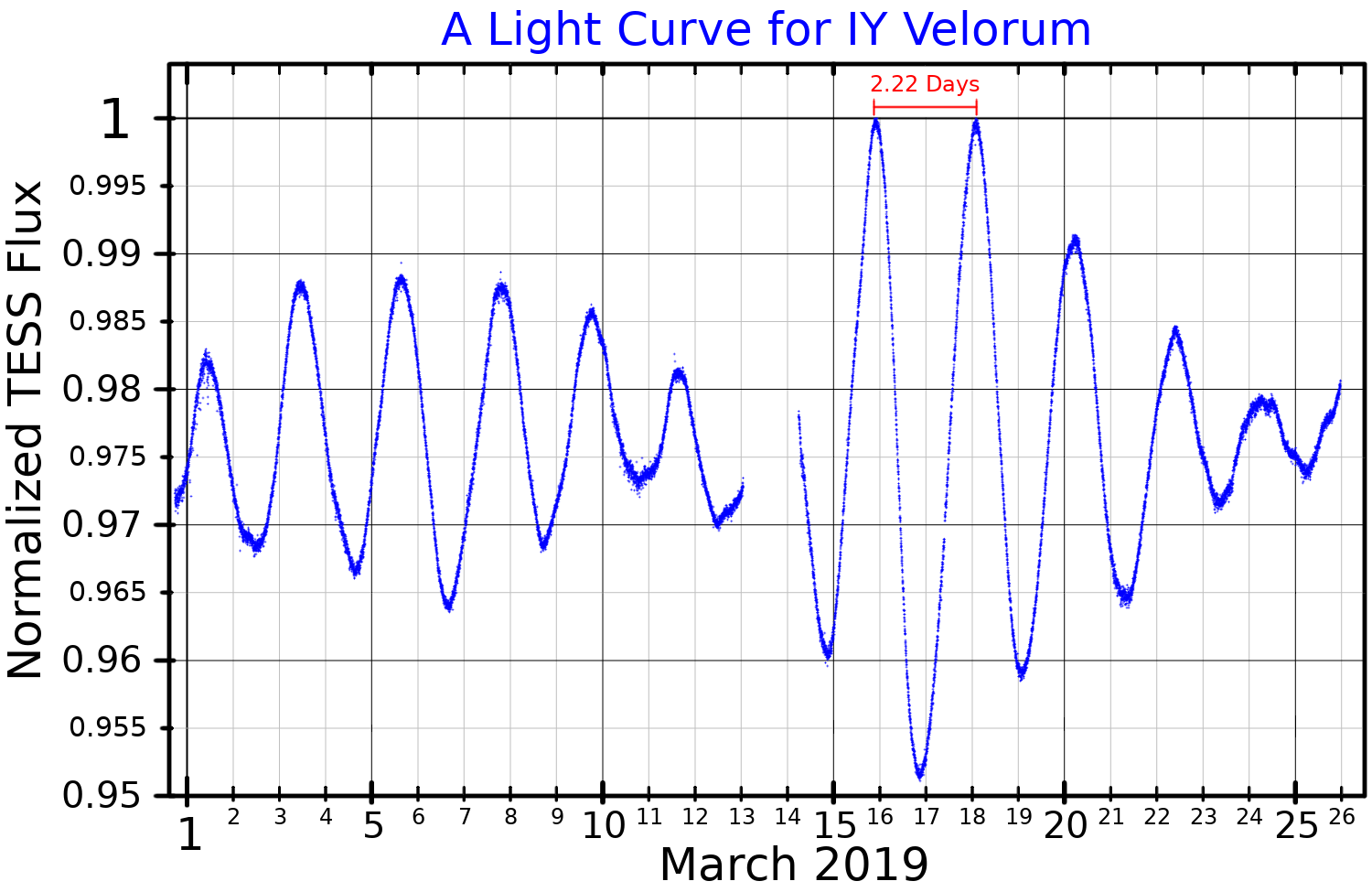
A light curve for IY Velorum, plotted from TESS data. The mean 2.22 day period is marked in red.

In 1982, Burki et al. reported that the star showed pulsations with multiple periods, namely 1.97 days, 1.73 days, and 1.66 days, all with amplitudes of several mmag that produce a combined peak-to-peak amplitude of about 0.04 mag. As such, they categorized the star as a multiperiodic slowly pulsating B-type star (SPB). In 1986, however, Balona & Laing were only able to confirm one major period of 2.22 days. Due to the small projected rotational velocity, they classified it as a rotating ellipsoidal variable instead, which would have been indicative of a close binary with an orbital period of 4.44 days. Further observations were conducted by Balona, who, in 1994, changed his position and concluded that the star was indeed a SPB, having discovered that the 2.22 day period he previously found was actually the mean of three distinct periods at 1.9566 days, 2.1072 days, and 2.4563 days. It shows similarities to HR 2680, another SPB.

== HR 3562B ==
HR 3562 was first discovered to be a double star by John Herschel in 1836. In 2001, it was confirmed that this was a physical binary system rather than an optical double i.e., a pair of unrelated stars closely aligned by chance. The pair are spaced 10,024 AU (0.15850 ly) apart, based on the separation of 35.0 arcseconds. This secondary is a post-T Tauri star, currently in the main sequence, with a Sun-like mass (0.98-1.01 M_{☉}) and a slightly cooler temperature of 5,613 K (5,340 °C; 9,644 °F), emitting 64% the Sun's luminosity. The star is aged about 50-110 million years.
