= 53 Persei =

Star in the constellation Perseus

- Location of 53 Persei (circled)

Observation data Epoch J2000 Equinox ICRS
- Constellation: Perseus
- Right ascension: 04^{h} 21^{m} 33.16624^{s}
- Declination: +46° 29′ 55.9648″
- Apparent magnitude (V): 4.77 - 4.86

Characteristics
- Evolutionary stage: main sequence
- Spectral type: B4IV
- U−B color index: −0.52
- B−V color index: −0.03
- Variable type: SPB

Astrometry
Radial velocity (R_{v})	+7.30 km/s
Proper motion (μ)	RA: +21.659 mas/yr Dec.: −35.177 mas/yr
Parallax (π)	6.8802±0.1353 mas
Distance	474 ± 9 ly (145 ± 3 pc)
Absolute magnitude (M_{V})	−1.42

Details
Mass	5.9±0.1 M_{☉}
Radius	3.98±0.49 R_{☉}
Luminosity	779.8+213.3 −167.5 L_{☉}
Surface gravity (log g)	3.93±0.09 cgs
Temperature	16,720 K
Rotational velocity (v sin i)	15 km/s
Age	50.1±9.3 Myr

Other designations
- d Per, 53 Per, V469 Per, NSV 1560, BD+46°872, FK5 2319, GC 5256, HD 27396, HIP 20354, HR 1350, SAO 39483

Database references
SIMBAD	data

53 Persei is a single variable star in the northern constellation of Perseus. It has the Bayer designation d Persei, while 53 Persei is the Flamsteed designation. The star is visible to the naked eye as a faint, blue-white hued point of light with an apparent visual magnitude of 4.8. It is located approximately 480 light years away from the Sun, as determined from parallax, and is drifting further away with a radial velocity of +7.3 km/s.

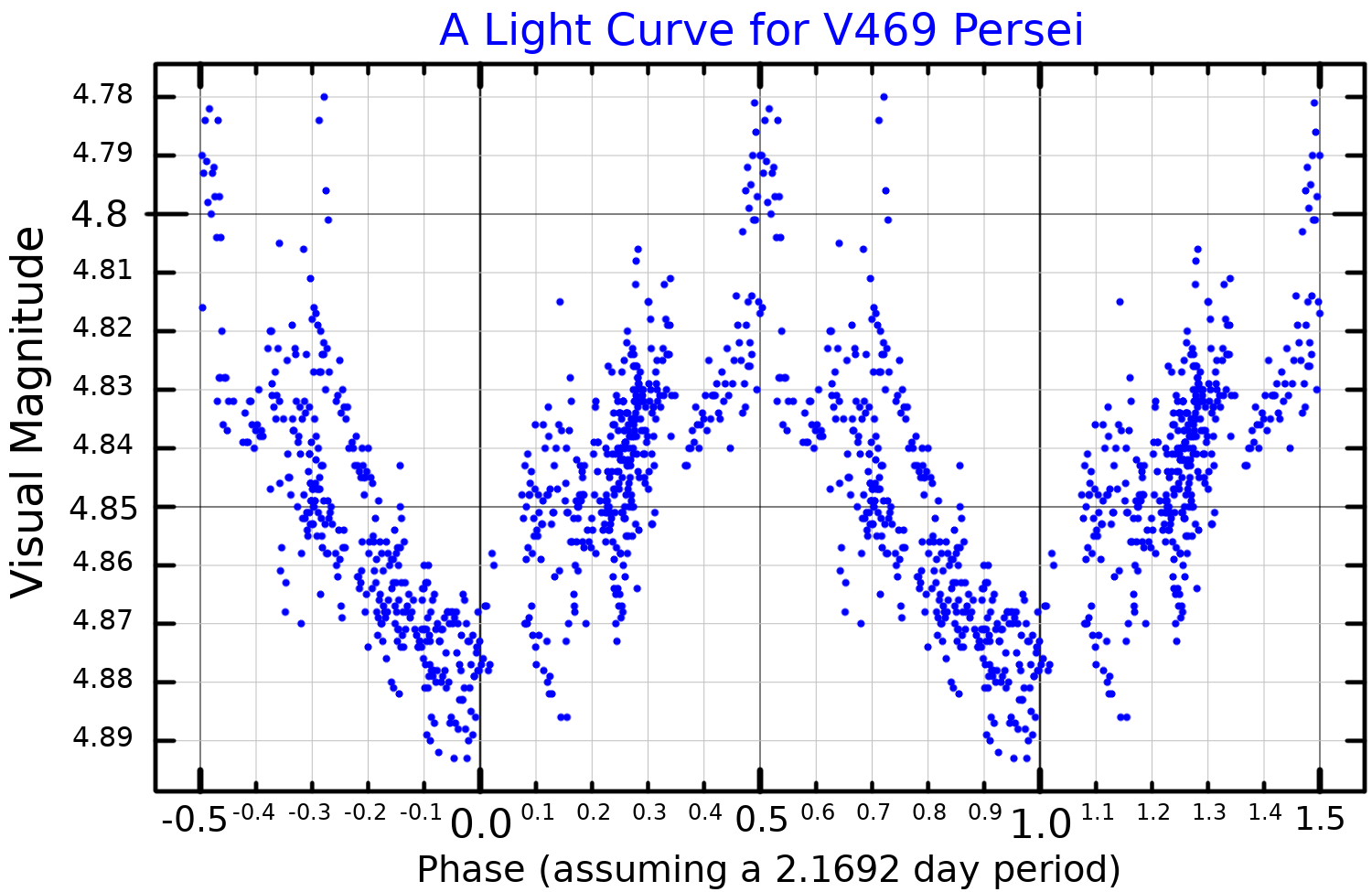
A visual band light curve for V469 Persei, plotted from data published by Huang et al. (1994)

This star has a stellar classification of B4IV, and was the prototype of a class of variable stars known as slowly pulsating B stars. It was one of the first mid-B type variable stars in the northern hemisphere to be studied. The star undergoes non-radial pulsations with a primary period of 2.36 days. Observation of the star with the BRITE satellite revealed eight separate frequencies in the star's light curve.

53 Persei is around 50 million years old with a projected rotational velocity of 15 km/s. It has six times the mass of the Sun and four times the Sun's radius. The star is radiating 780 times the luminosity of the Sun from its photosphere at an effective temperature of 16,720 K.
