= Mu Eridani =

Variable star in the constellation Eridanus

μ Eridani
- Location of μ Eridani (circled in red)

Observation data Epoch J2000.0 Equinox J2000.0 (ICRS)
- Constellation: Eridanus
- Right ascension: 04^{h} 45^{m} 30.15038^{s}
- Declination: −03° 15′ 16.7765″
- Apparent magnitude (V): 4.00

Characteristics
- Spectral type: B5 IV
- U−B color index: −0.60
- B−V color index: −0.15
- Variable type: SPB and Algol

Astrometry
Proper motion (μ)	RA: +0.25 mas/yr Dec.: −1.97 mas/yr
Parallax (π)	6.25±0.19 mas
Distance	520 ± 20 ly (160 ± 5 pc)
Absolute magnitude (M_{V})	−2.06±0.07

Orbit
Period (P)	7.38090 d
Eccentricity (e)	0.344±0.021
Periastron epoch (T)	2455143.254±0.067 HJD
Argument of periastron (ω) (secondary)	160.5±4.5°
Semi-amplitude (K_{1}) (primary)	0.344±0.021 km/s

Details

μ Eri A
Mass	6.2±0.2 M_{☉}
Radius	6.1 R_{☉}
Luminosity	1,905 L_{☉}
Surface gravity (log g)	3.5 cgs
Temperature	15,668 K
Metallicity [Fe/H]	0 dex
Rotational velocity (v sin i)	130±3 km/s

Other designations
- μ Eri, BD−03°876, 57 Eridani, FK5 176, HD 30211, HIP 22109, HR 1520, SAO 131468

Database references
SIMBAD	data

Mu Eridani (μ Eridani) is a binary star system in the constellation Eridanus. It is visible to the naked eye with an apparent visual magnitude of 4.00. Based upon an annual parallax shift of 0.00625 arcseconds, it is located roughly 520 light years from the Sun.

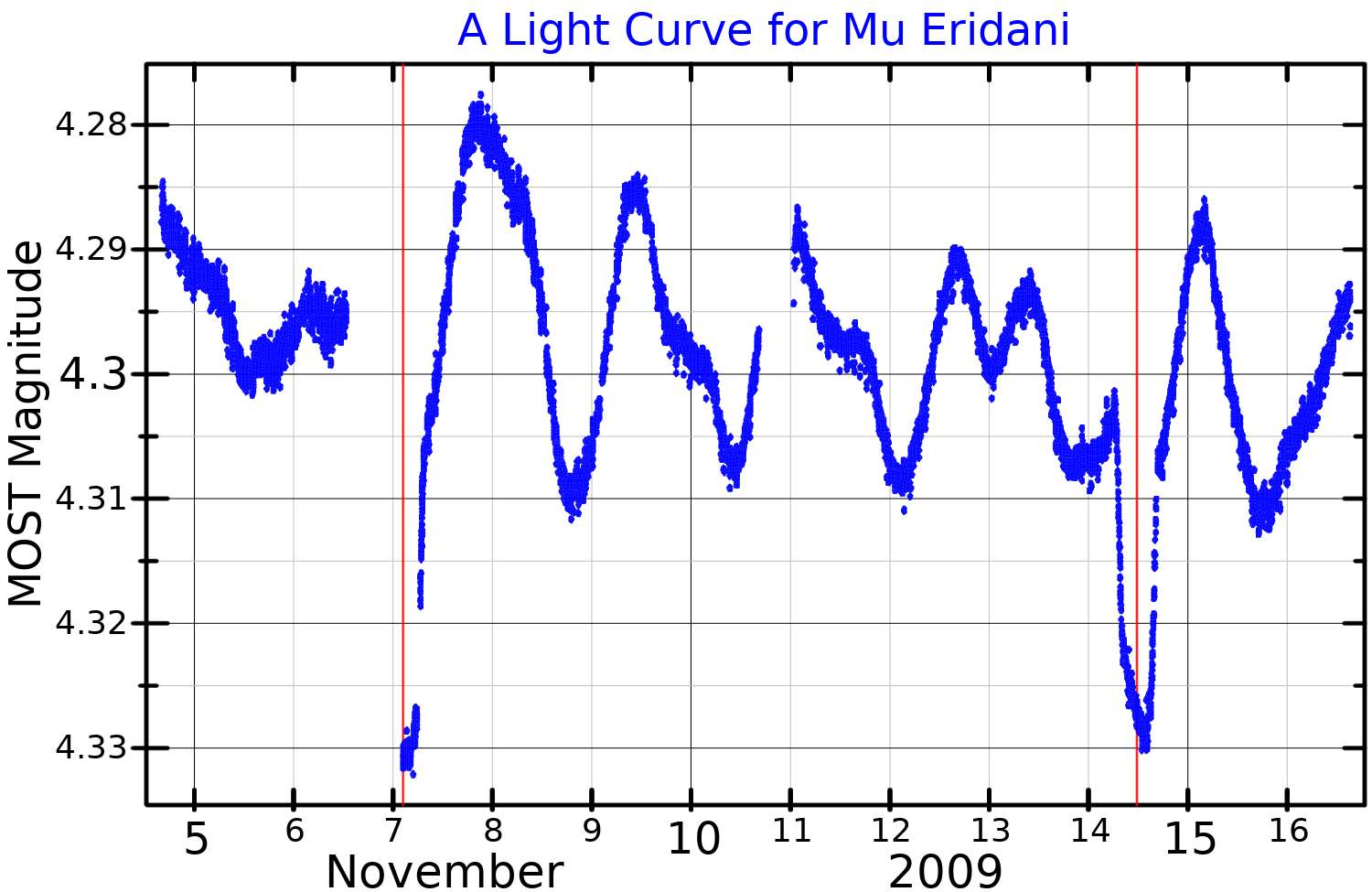
A light curve for Mu Eridani, adapted from Jerzykiewicz et al. (2013). The red lines show the times of mid-eclipse.

In 1910, this was determined to be a single-lined spectroscopic binary star system. The pair orbit each other with a period of 7.38 days and an eccentricity of 0.344, during which they undergo Algol-like eclipses. The primary is a slowly pulsating B-type star with a stellar classification of B5 IV. Additionally, the variability of the star's brightness due to pulsations was first detected by Gerald Handler et al. in 2004. One year later, Mikołaj Jerzykiewicz et al. announced that eclipses had been detected. It has a relatively high rate of rotation with a projected rotational velocity of 130 km/s, which is at least 30% of the star's break-up velocity. The star has about six times the Sun's mass and radius, and it shines with 1,905 times the solar luminosity from its outer atmosphere at an effective temperature of 15,668 K.
