= 26 Canis Majoris =

Star in the constellation Canis Major

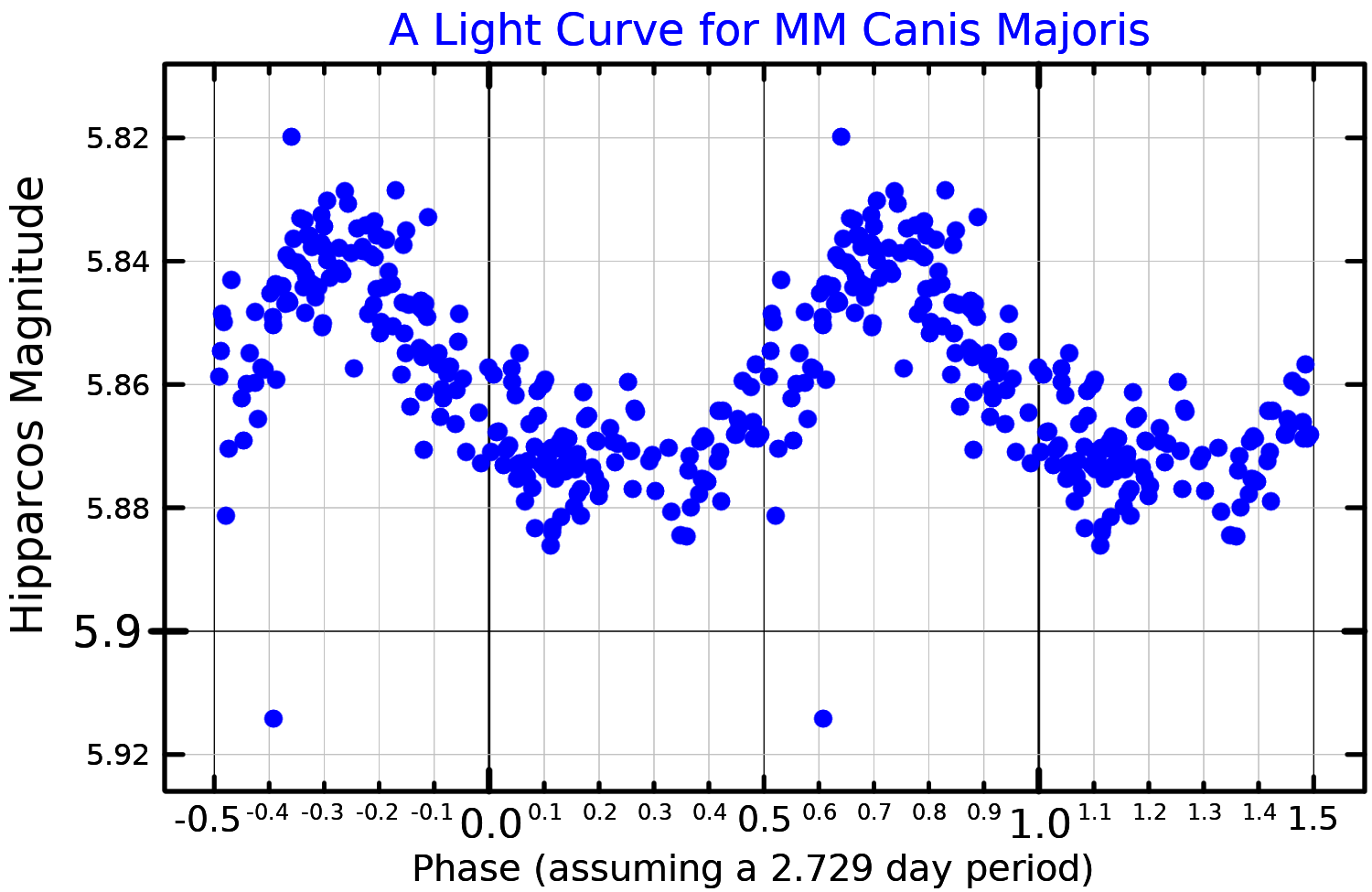
- A light curve for MM Canis Majoris from Hipparcos data, adapted from Aerts et al. (1999)

Observation data Epoch J2000 Equinox J2000
- Constellation: Canis Major
- Right ascension: 07^{h} 12^{m} 12.21471^{s}
- Declination: −25° 56′ 33.3161″
- Apparent magnitude (V): 5.89 or (5.84 – 5.87)

Characteristics
- Evolutionary stage: main sequence
- Spectral type: B2 IV/V
- B−V color index: −0.170±0.004
- Variable type: SPB

Astrometry
Radial velocity (R_{v})	+21.6±2.9 km/s
Proper motion (μ)	RA: −5.568 mas/yr Dec.: +9.286 mas/yr
Parallax (π)	3.5923±0.0500 mas
Distance	910 ± 10 ly (278 ± 4 pc)
Absolute magnitude (M_{V})	−1.11

Details
Mass	5.5±0.9 M_{☉}
Radius	3.25 R_{☉}
Luminosity	1,000+995 −499 L_{☉}
Surface gravity (log g)	3.777±0.027 cgs
Temperature	16,157±200 K
Rotation	2.729±0.001
Rotational velocity (v sin i)	64±14 km/s
Age	3.6±3.3 Myr

Other designations
- 26 CMa, MM CMa, BD−25°4191, GC 9545, HD 55522, HIP 34798, HR 2718, SAO 173193

Database references
SIMBAD	data

26 Canis Majoris is a variable star in the southern constellation of Canis Major, located around 910 light years away from the Sun. It has the variable star designation MM Canis Majoris; 26 Canis Majoris is the Flamsteed designation. This object is visible to the naked eye as a dim, blue-white hued star with a baseline apparent visual magnitude of 5.89. It is moving further from the Earth with a heliocentric radial velocity of +22 km/s.

With a stellar classification of B2 IV/V, it appears as a B-type main-sequence star intermixed with traits of an evolving subgiant star. The brightness of the star was found to be variable when the Hipparcos data was analyzed. It was given its variable star designation in 1999. Samus et al. (2017) classify it as a slowly pulsating B-type variable star (SPB), which ranges from magnitude 5.84 down to 5.87 with a rotationally-modulated period of 2.72945 days. Briquet et al. (2007) describe it as a chemically peculiar He-variable star, having inhomogeneous distributions of chemical elements across its surface. It has a variable, quasi-dipolar magnetic field, resulting in variations of the magnetic field and line strengths as it rotates.

This star is around 3.6 million years old with a rotation period of 2.7 days. It has 5.5 times the mass of the Sun and 3.25 times the Sun's radius. The star is radiating 1,000 times as much luminosity as the Sun from its photosphere at an effective temperature of 16,157 K.
