= HD 43317 =

Variable star in the constellation Orion

Observation data Epoch J2000.0 Equinox J2000.0
- Constellation: Orion
- Right ascension: 06^{h} 15^{m} 47.013^{s}
- Declination: +04° 17′ 01.10″
- Apparent magnitude (V): 6.63

Characteristics
- Evolutionary stage: Main sequence
- Spectral type: B3.5 V or B3 IV
- U−B color index: −0.646
- B−V color index: −0.164±0.010
- Variable type: SPB/β Cep hybrid

Astrometry
Radial velocity (R_{v})	13.0±4.4 km/s
Proper motion (μ)	RA: −4.231 mas/yr Dec.: −3.765 mas/yr
Parallax (π)	3.0975±0.0517 mas
Distance	1,050 ± 20 ly (323 ± 5 pc)
Absolute magnitude (M_{V})	−1.13

Details
Mass	5.8^{+0.1}_{−0.2} M_{☉}
Radius	3.39 R_{☉}
Luminosity	737.5 L_{☉}
Surface gravity (log g)	4.0±0.1 cgs
Temperature	17,350±750 K
Rotation	0.897673(4) d
Rotational velocity (v sin i)	115±9 km/s
Age	28.4 Myr

Other designations
- CoRoT 3412, BD+04° 1181, FK5 2478, HD 43317, HIP 29739, HR 2232, SAO 113653, PPM 150182

Database references
SIMBAD	data

HD 43317 is a variable star in the equatorial constellation of Orion, the hunter. It has an apparent visual magnitude of 6.63, which is faint enough to be a challenge to view with the naked eye under good conditions. Based on parallax measurements, it is located at a distance of approximately 1,050 light years from the Sun. It is drifting further away with a heliocentric radial velocity of about 13 km/s. This star is a member of an open cluster designated OCSN 63.

== Observations ==
During 2009–2010, HD 43317 was observed by the CoRoT space telescope during the LRa03 (long run) sequence for asteroseismological purposes. This program lasted for a period of 150.41 days, during which the star was under almost constant observation. After being combined with HARPS data, the star was classified as a hybrid slowly pulsating B-type star and a Beta Cephei variable. Both g (gravity) and p (pressure) mode pulsations were detected. It is spinning rapidly at about half of its critical velocity.

The photometry and spectrometry of HD 43317 showed rotational modulation of regions with temperature or chemical differences. These are an indirect indicator of a magnetic field. In addition, X-ray emission was detected by ROSAT, which also suggests a potential magnetic field. A magnetic field was directly detected with the Téléscope Bernard Lyot during 2012. The longitudinal field strength was found to vary with the 21.5 h rotation period, ranging from −140 G to 180 G. Modelling of the star's dipolar field found a strength between 1 and 1.5 kG. This is strong enough to force uniform rotation in the outer radiative zone of the star.

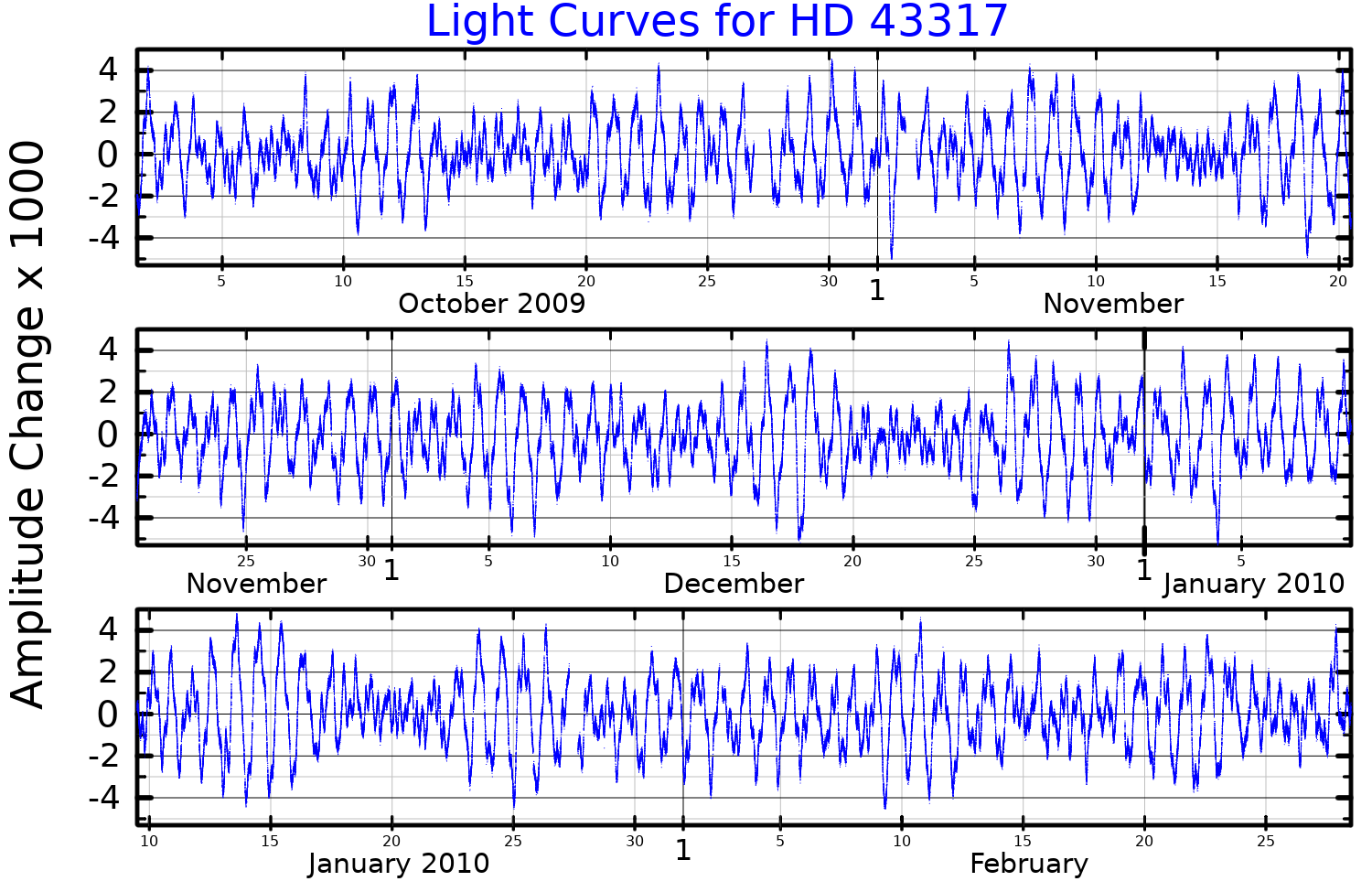
Light curves for HD 43317, plotted from CoRoT data. The star's average amplitude has been subtracted, leaving only the time variability.

The CoRoT light curve of the star displays 35 different frequencies, of which 28 are not related to the rotation period. Seismic modeling of the star determined a stellar mass equal to 5.8 times the mass of the Sun. At the core, the central mass fraction of hydrogen is 54%, compared to 70% for a newly formed main sequence star and 0.1% at the end of main sequence lifetime. Spectroscopic analysis shows an effective temperature of around 17,350 in the stellar atmosphere. A refined estimate of the surface magnetic field strength found a value of 1,312±332 G. The magnetic field near the core has a seismically modelled strength of 5×10^{5} G. HD 43317 is the first main sequence star for which an interior magnetic field strength has been inferred.

This star has an estimated radius of 3.39 times the girth of the Sun, and is radiating 737.5 times the Sun's luminosity. It is about 28.4 million years old.
