= Nu Eridani =

Variable star in the constellation Eridanus

ν Eridani
- Location of ν Eridani (circled in red)

Observation data Epoch J2000.0 Equinox J2000.0 (ICRS)
- Constellation: Eridanus
- Right ascension: 04^{h} 36^{m} 19.141^{s}
- Declination: −03° 21′ 08.86″
- Apparent magnitude (V): +3.930±0.023

Characteristics
- Spectral type: B1.5 IV
- U−B color index: −0.879±0.007
- B−V color index: −0.210±0.009
- Variable type: SPB and Beta Cephei

Astrometry
Radial velocity (R_{v})	14.9 km/s
Proper motion (μ)	RA: +1.53 mas/yr Dec.: −5.01 mas/yr
Parallax (π)	4.83±0.19 mas
Distance	680 ± 30 ly (207 ± 8 pc)
Absolute magnitude (M_{V})	−2.84±0.15

Details
Mass	9.3±0.3 M_{☉}
Radius	6.2±0.5 R_{☉}
Luminosity	7,943 L_{☉}
Surface gravity (log g)	3.85±0.05 cgs
Temperature	22,000±250 K
Rotational velocity (v sin i)	26±2 km/s

Other designations
- ν Eri, BD−03°834, 48 Eridani, FK5 169, HD 29248, HIP 21444, HR 1463, SAO 131346

Database references
SIMBAD	data

Nu Eridani (ν Eri) is a star in the constellation Eridanus. It is visible to the naked eye with an apparent visual magnitude of 3.93. The distance to this star is roughly 520 light years, based upon an annual parallax shift of 0.00625 arcseconds. If the star were 33 ly (10 pc) from the Sun, it would be the brightest star in the night sky with an apparent magnitude of −2.84. (Currently, the brightest star is Sirius at magnitude −1.46.)

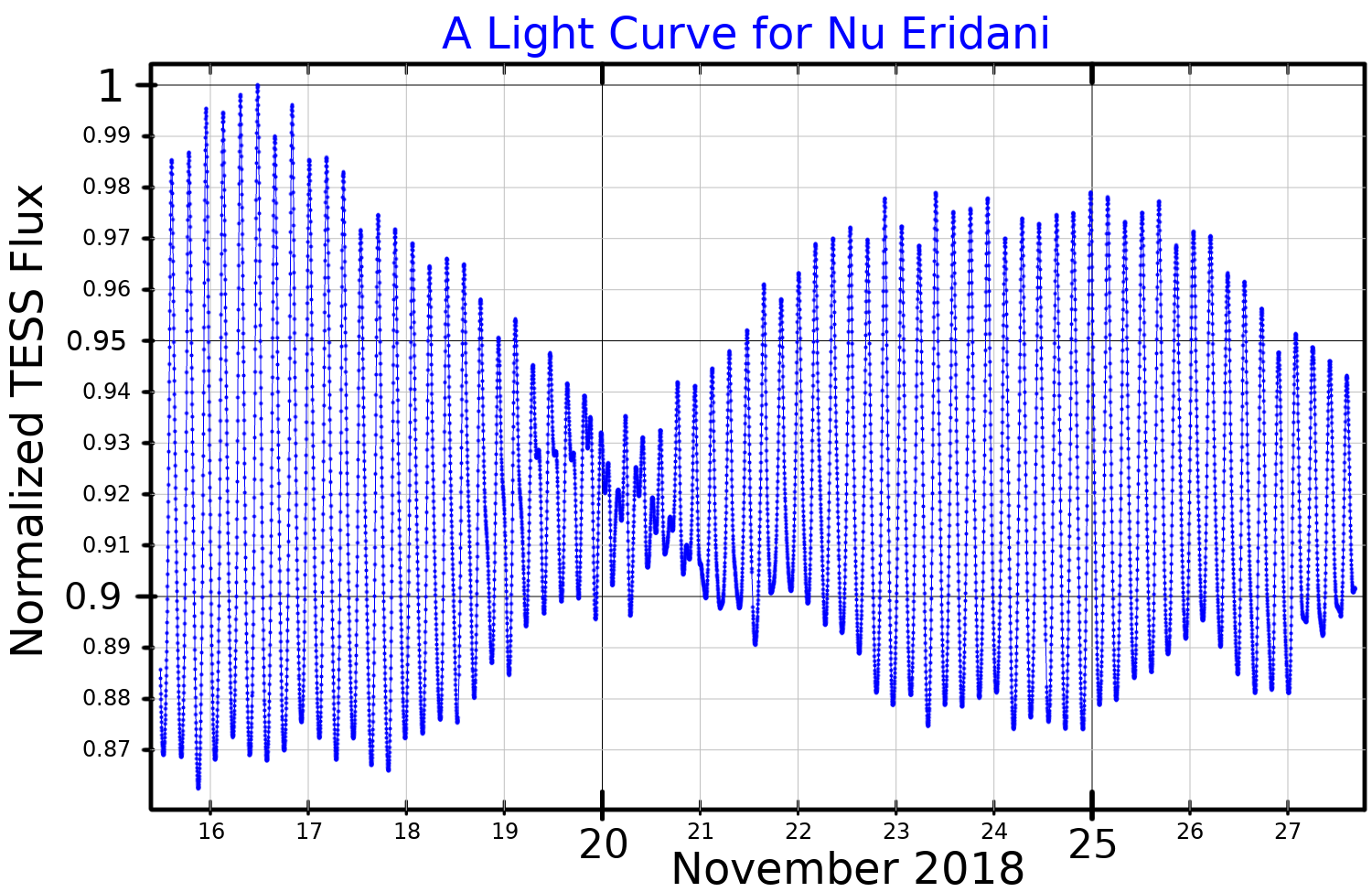
A light curve for Nu Eridani, plotted from TESS data

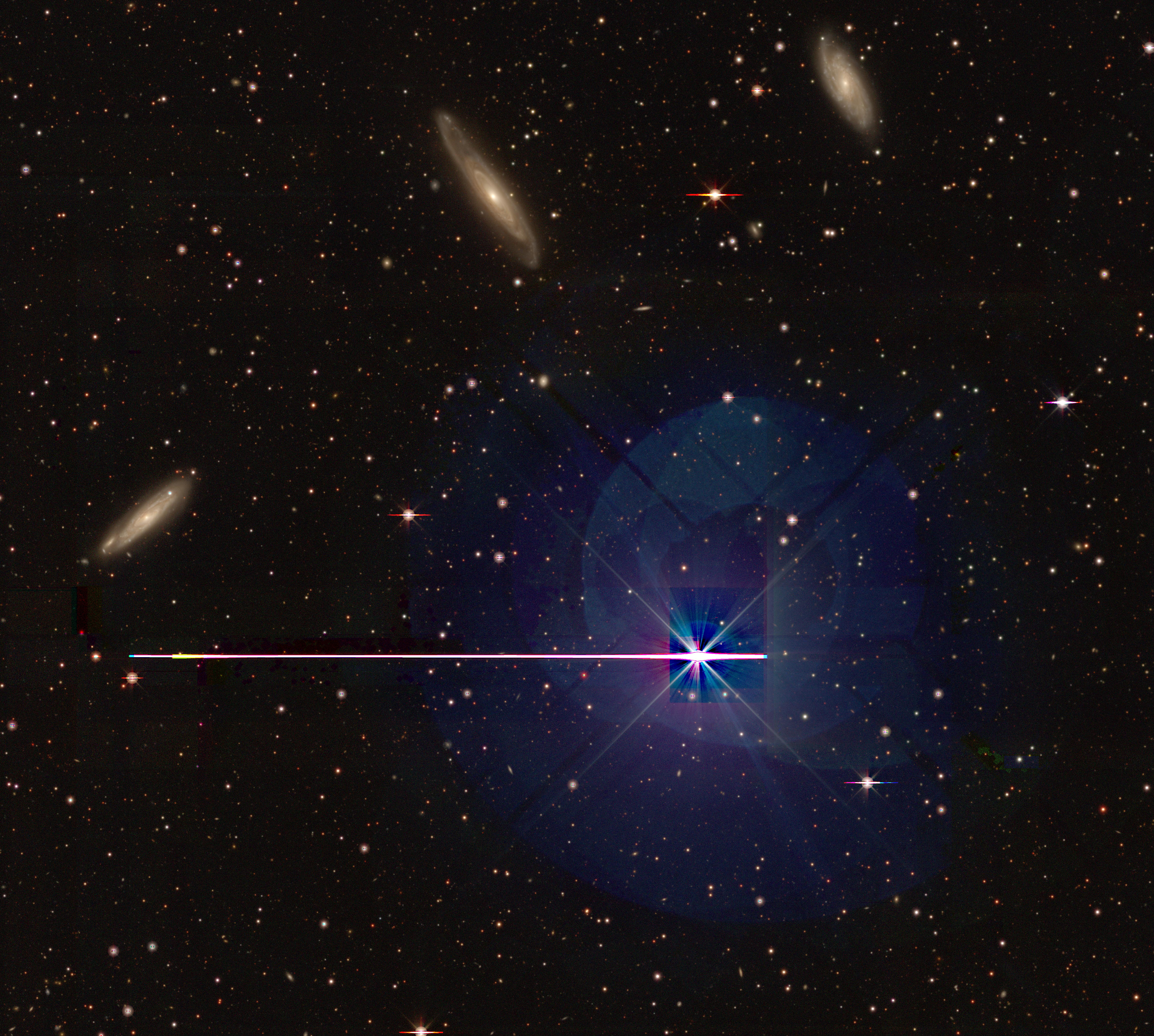
Nu Eridani (bright star) and the galaxies: NGC 1618, NGC 1622 and NGC 1625 (from right to left)

This is a B-type subgiant star with a stellar classification of B1.5 IV. In 1926, Robert H. Baker announced his discovery that the brightness of Nu Eridani is variable. It is a hybrid pulsator variable, lying as it does on the overlapping instability strips for Beta Cephei variables and slowly pulsating B-type stars. The star shows at least fourteen pulsations frequencies, with nine that also display radial velocity variations. It has about nine times the mass of the Sun and six times the Sun's radius. Nu Eridani shines with 7,943 times the solar luminosity from its outer atmosphere at an effective temperature of 22,000 K.
