= Xi Octantis =

Slowly pulsating B-dwarf in Octans

ξ Octantis
- Location of ξ Octantis (circled)

Observation data Epoch J2000.0 Equinox ICRS
- Constellation: Octans
- Right ascension: 22^{h} 50^{m} 22.8139^{s}
- Declination: −80° 07′ 25.842″
- Apparent magnitude (V): 5.32 - 5.36

Characteristics
- Evolutionary stage: main sequence
- Spectral type: B6 V (B5/7 V)
- U−B color index: −0.48
- B−V color index: −0.13
- Variable type: SPB

Astrometry
Radial velocity (R_{v})	22.1±0.5 km/s
Proper motion (μ)	RA: +20.003 mas/yr Dec.: −12.607 mas/yr
Parallax (π)	6.35±0.0644 mas
Distance	514 ± 5 ly (157 ± 2 pc)
Absolute magnitude (M_{V})	−0.57

Details
Mass	4.02±0.05 M_{☉}
Radius	3.0±0.5 R_{☉}
Luminosity	360^{+24}_{−22} L_{☉}
Surface gravity (log g)	4.09 cgs
Temperature	14,050 K
Metallicity [Fe/H]	−0.1 dex
Rotational velocity (v sin i)	30 km/s
Age	46^{+25}_{−16} Myr

Other designations
- ξ Oct, 77 G. Octantis, CD−80°828, CPD−80°1055, GC 31821, HD 215573, HIP 112781, HR 8663, SAO 258946

Database references
SIMBAD	data

Xi Octantis, Latinized from ξ Octantis, is a solitary variable star in the southern circumpolar constellation Octans. It has an apparent magnitude of about 5.3, allowing it to be faintly seen with the naked eye; however, this varies slightly. Located 514 light-years away, the object is receding with a heliocentric radial velocity of 22 km/s.

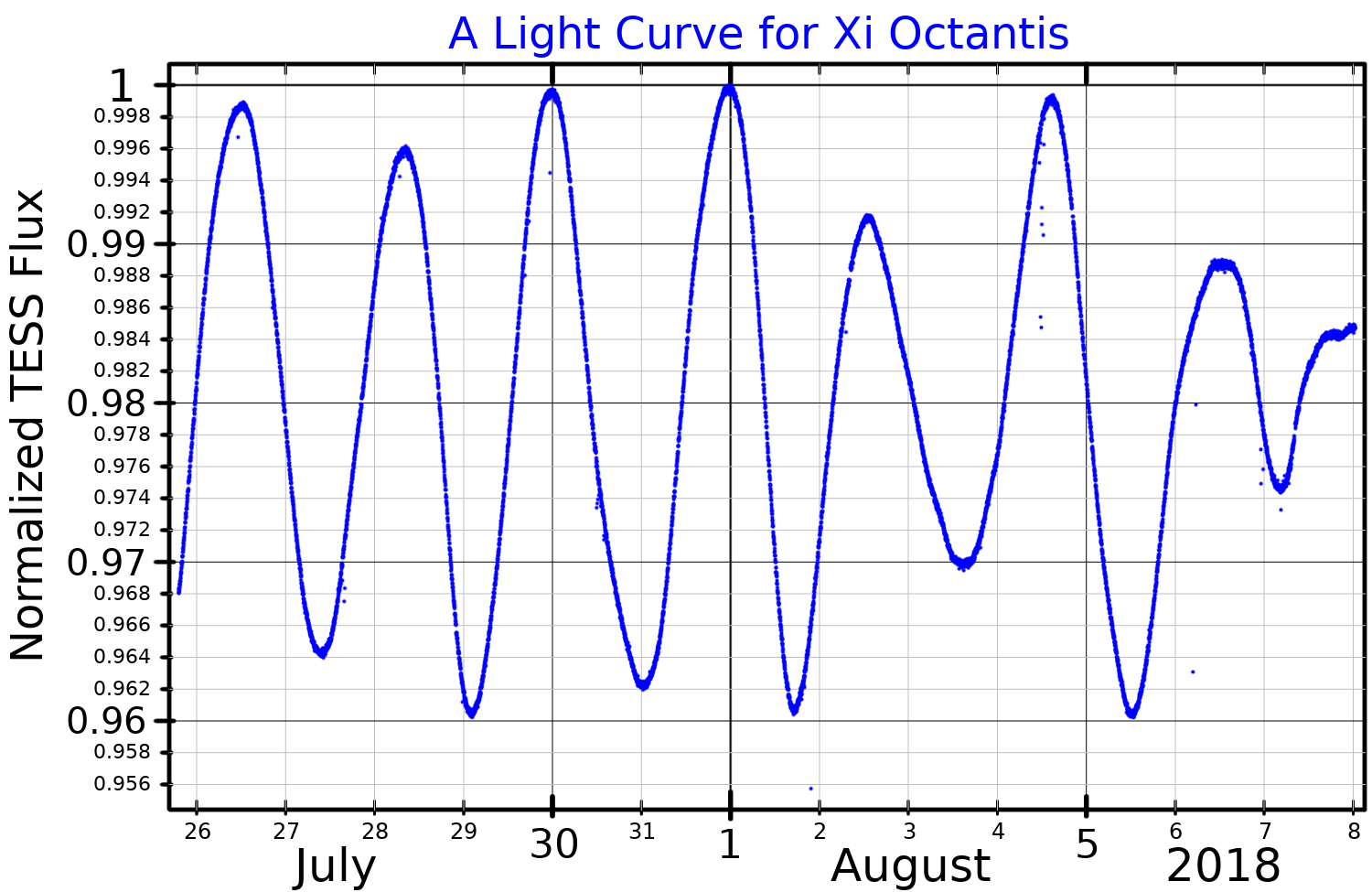
A light curve for Xi Octantis, plotted from TESS data

Xi Octantis has a stellar classification of B6 V, indicating that it is an ordinary B-type main-sequence star. Hintler et al. gives it a luminosity class IV (subgiant) while Houk and Cowley gives a classification intermediate between a B5 and B7 dwarf. Nevertheless, it has 4 times the mass of the Sun and is 3 times larger. It shines with a luminosity of 360 L_{☉} from its photosphere at an effective temperature of 14,050 K, giving it a whitish blue glow. Xi Octantis is 46 million years old—64.8% through its short main-sequence lifetime—and spins modestly with a projected rotational velocity of 30 km/s.

When the Hipparcos catalogue was released in 1997, Xi Octantis was found to vary in magnitude—ranging from 5.32 to 5.36 based on data from the International Variable Star Index. It has since been classified as a slowly pulsating B-dwarf with a period of 1.78 days.
