= Omicron Velorum =

Variable star in the constellation Vela

ο Velorum
- Location of ο Velorum (circled)

Observation data Epoch J2000.0 Equinox J2000.0
- Constellation: Vela
- Right ascension: 08^{h} 40^{m} 17.58553^{s}
- Declination: −52° 55′ 18.8002″
- Apparent magnitude (V): 3.57 – 3.63

Characteristics
- Evolutionary stage: main sequence
- Spectral type: B3/5(V)
- U−B color index: −0.62
- B−V color index: −0.18
- Variable type: SPB

Astrometry
Radial velocity (R_{v})	+16.1±0.7 km/s
Proper motion (μ)	RA: −24.42 mas/yr Dec.: +34.44 mas/yr
Parallax (π)	6.61±0.35 mas
Distance	490 ± 30 ly (151 ± 8 pc)
Absolute magnitude (M_{V})	−2.48

Details
Mass	5.5±0.4 M_{☉}
Radius	4.3±0.7 R_{☉}
Luminosity	1,000 L_{☉}
Surface gravity (log g)	3.91±0.20 cgs
Temperature	16,200±700 K
Rotational velocity (v sin i)	9±5 km/s
Age	39.8 Myr

Other designations
- CPD−52°1583, FK5 1227, HD 74195, HIP 42536, HR 3447, SAO 236164

Database references
SIMBAD	data

Omicron Velorum (ο Vel, ο Velorum) is a star in the constellation Vela. It is the brightest member of the loose naked eye open cluster IC 2391, also known as the ο Velorum Cluster.

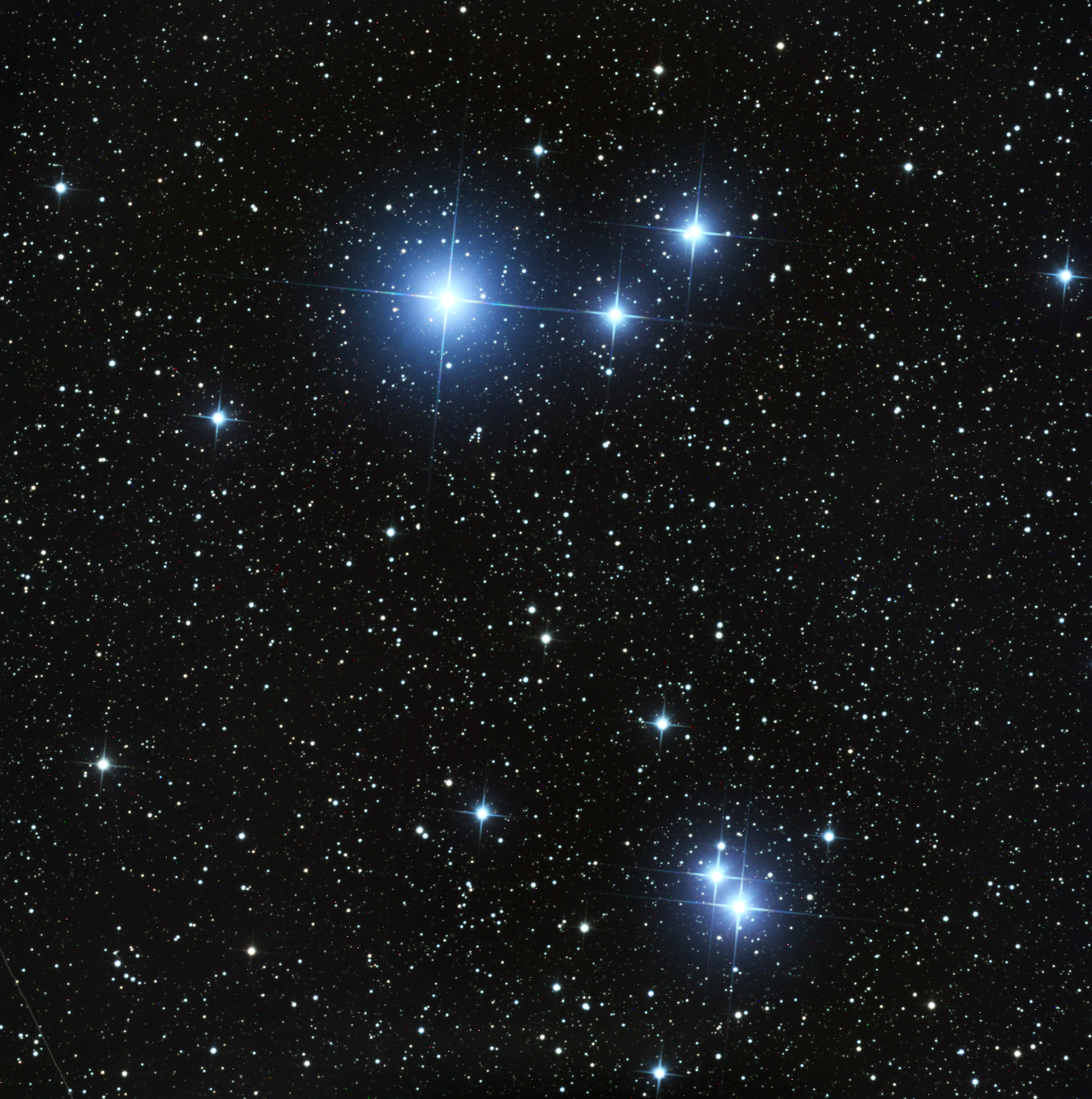
ο Velorum Cluster (north is to the left). ο Velorum itself is the brightest star in this image.

Omicron Velorum is a blue-white B-type star with a mean apparent magnitude of about +3.6. It is probably a main sequence object, but has also been classified as a subgiant or giant. It is approximately 495 light years from Earth.

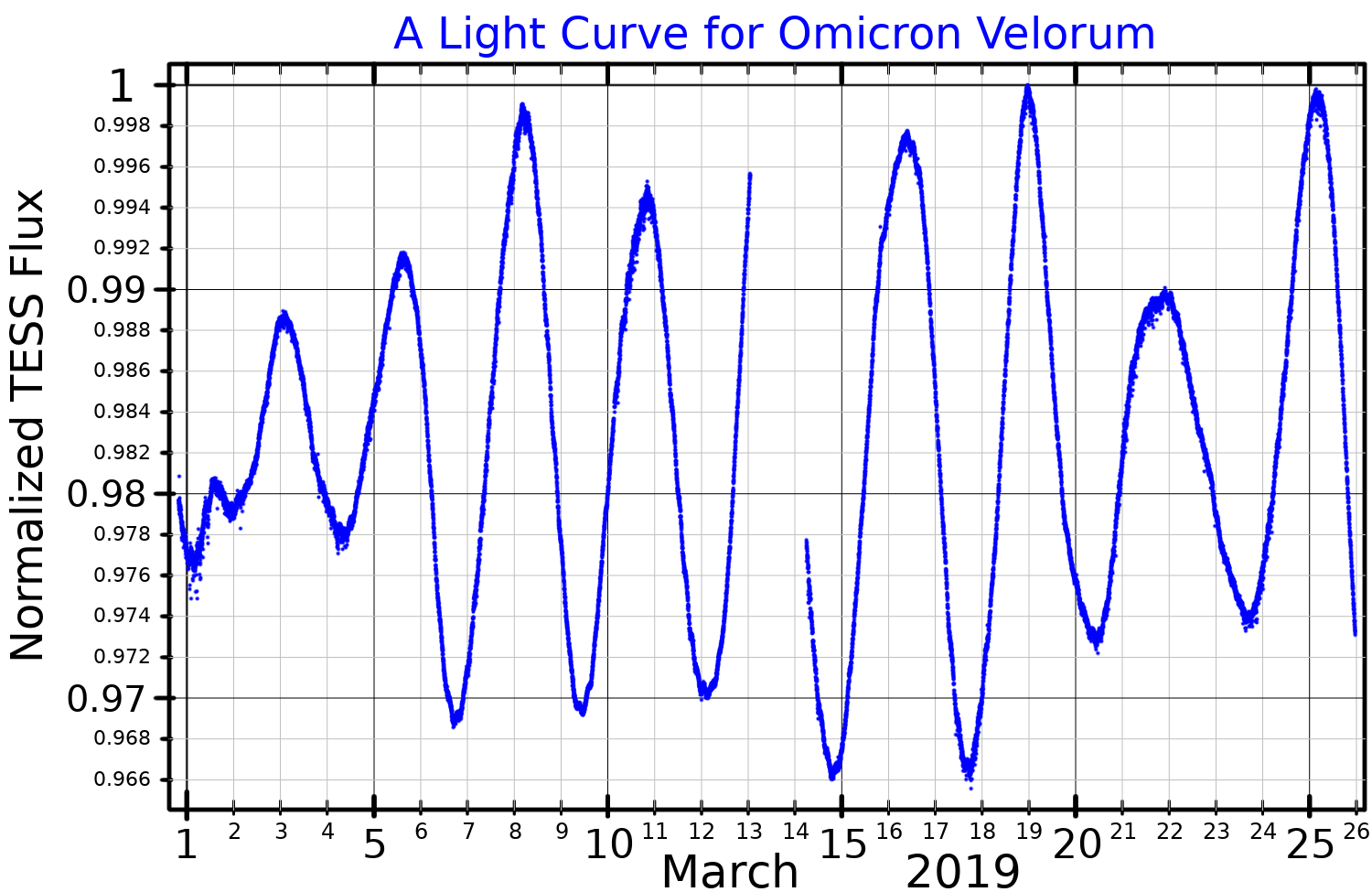
A light curve for Omicron Velorum, plotted from TESS data

Alan William James Cousins discovered that ο Velorum is a variable star in 1959. A slowly pulsating B-type star, it ranges between magnitudes 3.57 and 3.63 over 2.8 days.

The correct Bayer designation for ο Velorum has been debated. Lacaille assigned one Greek letter sequence for the bright stars of Argo Navis. These Lacaille designations are now shared across the three modern constellations of Carina, Puppis, and Vela so that (except for omicron) each Greek letter is found in only one of the three. However, ο (omicron) is now commonly used for two stars, one each in Vela and Puppis. In the Coelum Australe Stelliferum itself, ο Velorum is labelled ο (omicron) Argus (du Navire in the French edition), while ο Puppis is labelled (Latin) o Argus in puppi (Pouppe du Navire in the French edition). Some later authors state the reverse, that Lacaille actually assigned omicron to ο Puppis and Latin lower case 'o' to ο Velorum. Modern catalogs and atlases generally use omicron for both stars.
