= HD 118285 =

SPB star in the constellation Chamaeleon

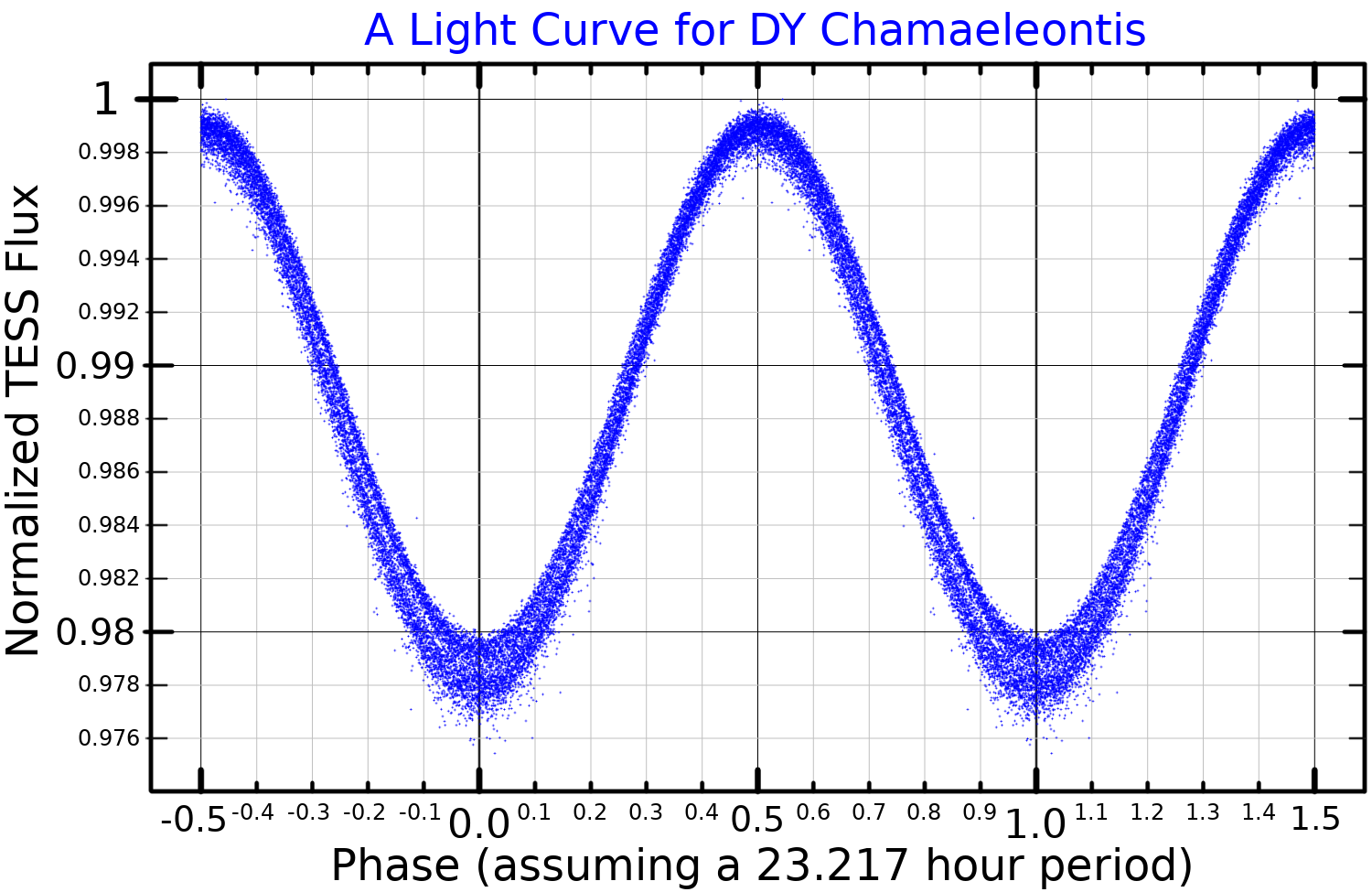
- A light curve for DY Chamaeleontis, plotted from TESS data

Observation data Epoch J2000.0 Equinox ICRS
- Constellation: Chamaeleon
- Right ascension: 13^{h} 39^{m} 11.99015^{s}
- Declination: −75° 41′ 01.6128″
- Apparent magnitude (V): 6.32 (6.34 - 6.38)

Characteristics
- Evolutionary stage: main sequence star
- Spectral type: B8 IV
- U−B color index: −0.26
- B−V color index: +0.01
- Variable type: SPB

Astrometry
Radial velocity (R_{v})	18.2±2.3 km/s
Proper motion (μ)	RA: −20.690 mas/yr Dec.: −14.712 mas/yr
Parallax (π)	3.7743±0.0289 mas
Distance	864 ± 7 ly (265 ± 2 pc)
Absolute magnitude (M_{V})	−0.54

Details
Mass	3.63±0.12 M_{☉}
Radius	5.52±0.28 R_{☉}
Luminosity	293^{+50}_{−42} L_{☉}
Temperature	11,350^{+79}_{−78} K
Metallicity [Fe/H]	0.00 dex
Rotational velocity (v sin i)	67 km/s
Age	309 Myr

Other designations
- 49 G. Chamaeleontis, DY Cha, CD−75°632, CPD−75°882, FK5 503, GC 18406, HD 118285, HIP 66607, HR 5115, SAO 257069

Database references
SIMBAD	data

HD 118285, also known as HR 5115, is a variable star located in the southern circumpolar constellation Chamaeleon. DY Chamaeleontis (DY Cha) is its variable star designation. It has an average apparent magnitude of 6.32, placing it near the limit for naked eye visibility. The object is located relatively far at a distance of 864 light years based on Gaia DR3 parallax measurements but is receding with a heliocentric radial velocity of 18 km/s. At its current distance, HD 118285's brightness is diminished by 0.58 magnitudes due to interstellar dust.

HD 118285's variability was first observed in a 1998 Hipparcos survey focusing on the discovery of slowly pulsating B-type stars (SPB). It was later confirmed to be an SPB star and given the variable designation DY Chamaeleontis. It fluctuates between magnitudes 6.34 and 6.38 in the visual passband with a period of 23 hours.

This is a slightly evolved B-type star with a stellar classification of B8 IV. Contrary to the classification, stellar evolution models from Zorec and Royer (2012) model it as a dwarf star that has completed 89.1% of its main sequence life. It has 3.6 times the mass of the Sun and 5.5 times its girth. It radiates 293 times the luminosity of the Sun from its photosphere at an effective temperature of 11,350 K, giving it a bluish-white hue. It is estimated to be 309 million years old and spins modestly with a projected rotational velocity of 67 km/s.
