= 25 Serpentis =

Star in the constellation Serpens

- Location of 25 Serpentis (circled)

Observation data Epoch J2000.0 Equinox ICRS
- Constellation: Serpens
- Right ascension: 15^{h} 46^{m} 05.63636^{s}
- Declination: −01° 48′ 15.0830″
- Apparent magnitude (V): 5.37 - 5.40

Characteristics
- Spectral type: B8IV/V
- U−B color index: −0.40
- B−V color index: −0.05
- Variable type: SPB

Astrometry
Radial velocity (R_{v})	9.50±0.3 km/s
Proper motion (μ)	RA: −23.15 mas/yr Dec.: −30.50 mas/yr
Parallax (π)	7.25±0.31 mas
Distance	450 ± 20 ly (138 ± 6 pc)
Absolute magnitude (M_{V})	−0.3

Orbit
Period (P)	38.927±0.004
Eccentricity (e)	0.731±0.006
Periastron epoch (T)	2450132.80±0.06
Argument of periastron (ω) (secondary)	201.8±0.8°
Semi-amplitude (K_{1}) (primary)	43.1±0.7 km/s
Semi-amplitude (K_{2}) (secondary)	86±1 km/s

Details
Mass	4.1 M_{☉}
Luminosity	383 L_{☉}
Temperature	13,932 K
Rotational velocity (v sin i)	80 km/s

Other designations
- A^{2} Ser, 25 Ser, PT Ser, HD 140873, HIP 77227, HR 5863, SAO 140740, BD−01°3092

Database references
SIMBAD	data

25 Serpentis is a star system in the constellation of Serpens Caput. With an apparent magnitude of 5.4, it is just barely visible to the naked eye. The system is estimated to be some 450 light-years (138 parsecs) based on its parallax.

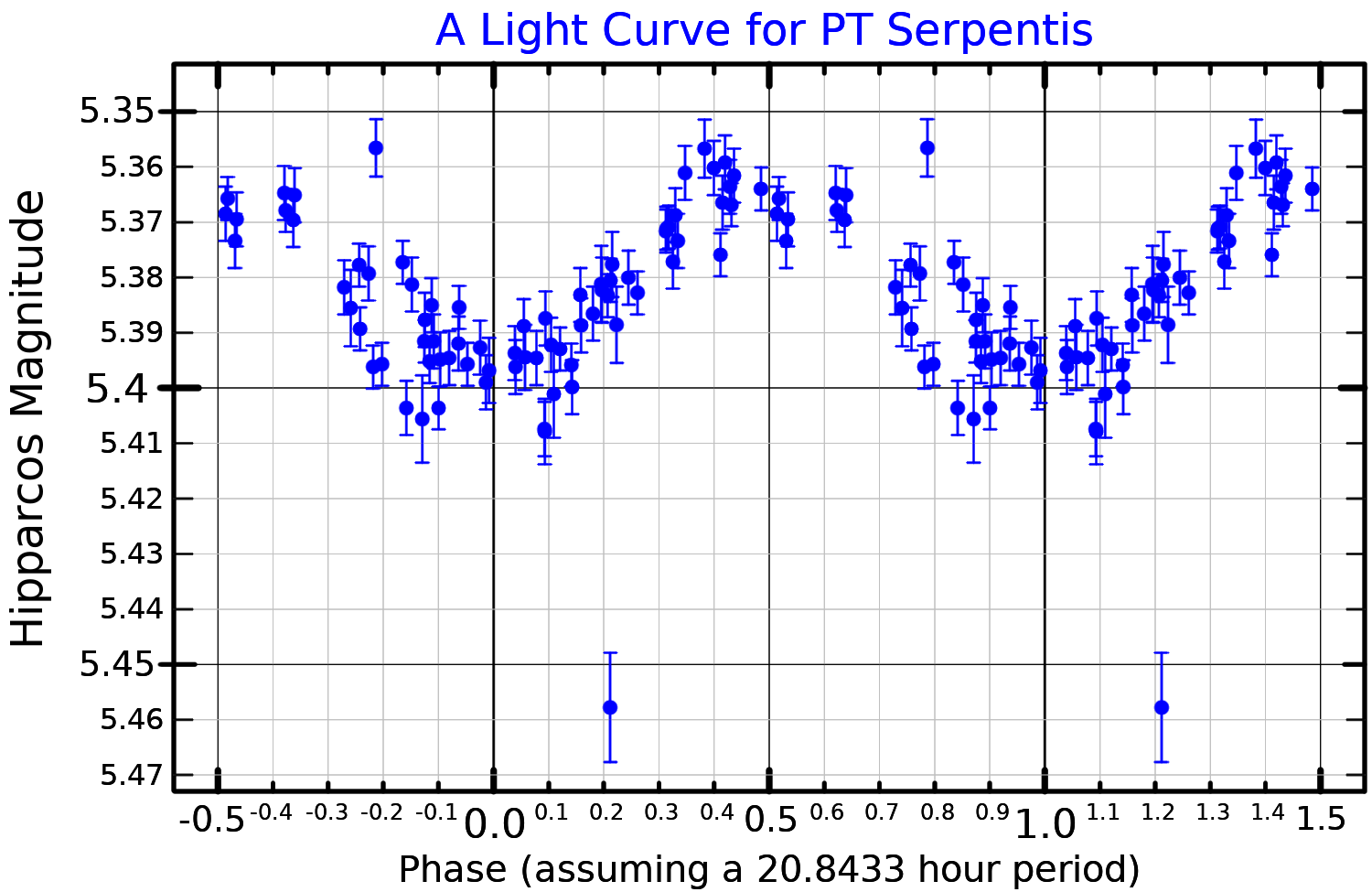
A light curve for PT Serpentis, plotted from Hipparcos data

25 Serpentis is a spectroscopic binary, meaning that the individual components are too close to be resolved, but periodic Doppler shifts in their spectra indicate orbital motion. The system consists of a hot B-type giant and an A-type main-sequence star. The two stars orbit each other every 38.9 days, and have a very eccentric orbit, with an orbital eccentricity of 0.731. The star was found to be a variable star in 1996, when the Hipparcos data was analyzed. The primary is a slowly pulsating B-type star, which causes the system to vary by 0.03 magnitudes; for that reason it was given the variable star designation PT Serpentis in 1999.
