= V539 Arae =

Triple star system in the constellation Ara

- The location of V539 Arae (circled)

Observation data Epoch J2000 Equinox ICRS
- Constellation: Ara
- Right ascension: 17^{h} 50^{m} 28.393^{s}
- Declination: −53° 36′ 44.66″
- Apparent magnitude (V): 5.62

Characteristics
- Spectral type: B2 V + B3 V + A1 V
- U−B color index: −0.64
- B−V color index: −0.099±0.017
- Variable type: Algol/SPB

Astrometry
Radial velocity (R_{v})	−4.3±2.9 km/s
Proper motion (μ)	RA: +2.517 mas/yr Dec.: −12.105 mas/yr
Parallax (π)	2.5208±0.1096 mas
Distance	1,290 ± 60 ly (400 ± 20 pc)
Absolute magnitude (M_{V})	−1.83/−1.11

Orbit
Period (P)	3.1690854(12) d
Eccentricity (e)	0.0548(15)
Inclination (i)	85.2°
Argument of periastron (ω) (secondary)	118.9(1.2)°

Details

V539 Ara A
Mass	6.239±0.066 M_{☉}
Radius	4.551±0.019 R_{☉}
Luminosity	2,000^{+240}_{−210} L_{☉}
Surface gravity (log g)	3.9170±0.0029 cgs
Temperature	18,100±500 K
Rotational velocity (v sin i)	100 km/s
Age	23.2±2.9 Myr

V539 Ara B
Mass	5.313±0.060 M_{☉}
Radius	3.575±0.035 R_{☉}
Luminosity	980^{+130}_{−110} L_{☉}
Surface gravity (log g)	4.0570±0.0084 cgs
Temperature	17,100±500 K
Rotational velocity (v sin i)	130 km/s

Other designations
- Boss 4496, ν^{1} Arae, V539 Ara, CD−53°7423, GC 24187, HD 161783, HIP 87314, HR 6622, SAO 245065, PPM 346351, WDS J17505-5337A

Database references
SIMBAD	AB
- A

V539 Arae is a multiple star system in the southern constellation of Ara. It has the Bayer designation Nu^{1} Arae, which is Latinized from ν^{1} Arae and abbreviated Nu^{1} Ara or ν^{1} Ara. This is a variable star system, the brightness of which varies from magnitude 5.71 to 6.24, making it faintly visible to the naked eye under good observing conditions. Based upon an annual parallax shift of 2.52 mas, this system is at a distance of approximately 1,290 light-years (400 parsecs) from Earth. The system is drifting closer to the Sun with a radial velocity of −4 km/s.

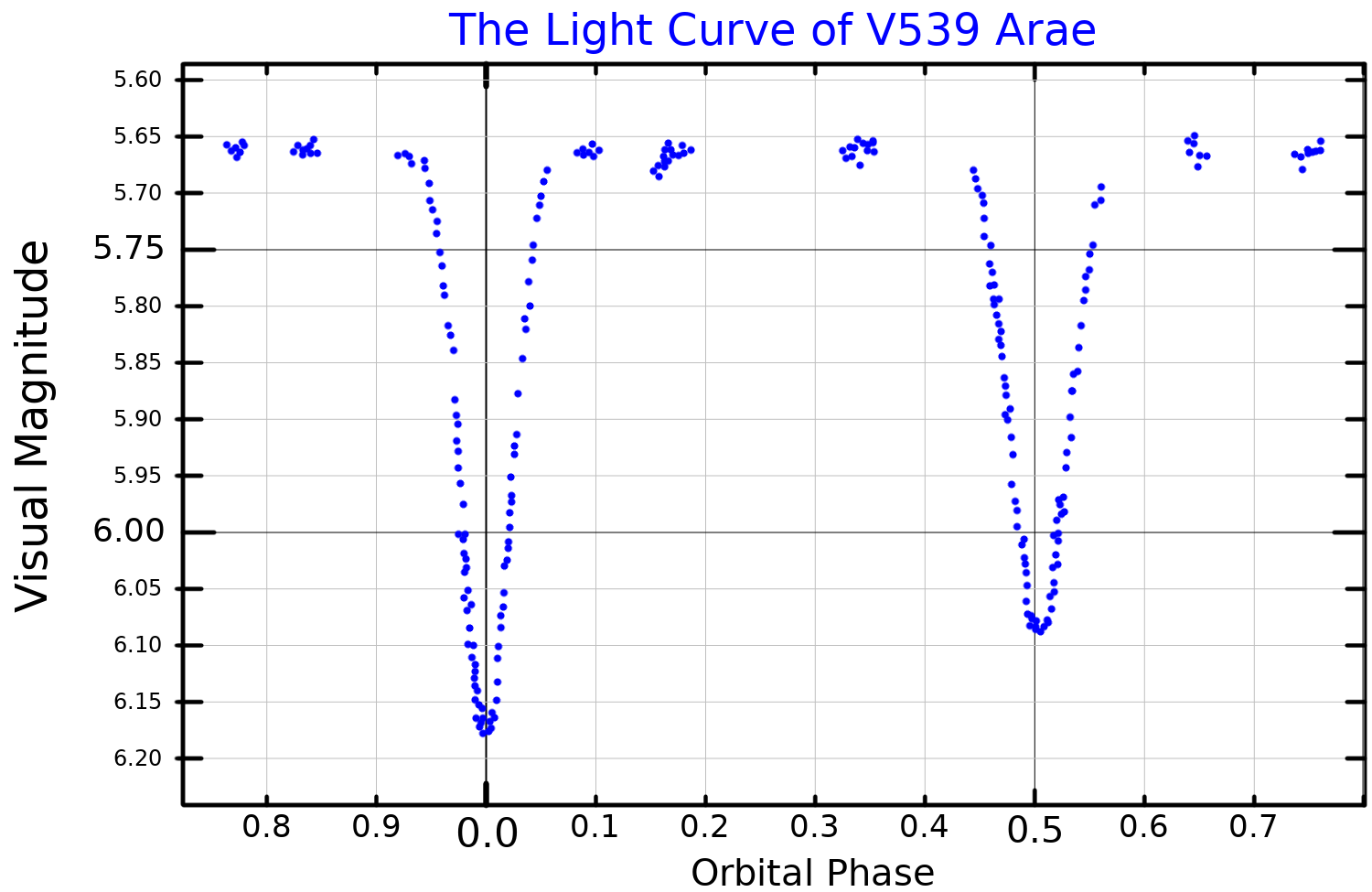
A visual-band light curve for V539 Arae, adapted from Knipe (1971)

In 1930, Ferdinand Johannes Neubauer found that the star (usually called Boss 4496 at the time) is a spectroscopic binary. He did not detect any brightness variability. Eclipses were first reported by E. Schoeffel and U. Kohler in 1965. The period they reported is half the currently accepted value, because they did not realize that the light curve has a deep secondary minimum. In 1996, the secondary component was found to be a slowly pulsating B-type star (SPB) with periods of periods of 1.36, 1.78 and possibly 1.08 days.

The core members of this system, ν^{1} Ara AB, consist of a pair of B-type main-sequence stars in a detached orbit with a period of 3.169 days and an eccentricity of 0.055. Their respective stellar classifications are B2 V and B3 V, and they have a combined visual magnitude of 5.65. Because the orbital plane lies close to the line of sight from the Earth, this pair form a detached eclipsing binary of the Algol type. The eclipse of the primary causes a decrease of 0.52 in magnitude, while the secondary eclipse decreases the magnitude by 0.43.

At an angular separation of 12.34 arcseconds, is a possible tertiary component of this system; a magnitude 9.40 A-type main-sequence star with a classification of A1 V. A 2005 study of the orbit of the main pair demonstrated an apsidal motion, suggesting the influence of a third body. The initial estimate found an orbital period of 42.3±0.8 years and a mass of 1.63 M_{☉}. In 2022, a more refined study suggested the influence of two stellar objects with masses of 0.41 M_{☉} and 1.74 M_{☉}.

The system is sometimes referred as Upsilon^{1} Arae (υ^{1} Arae), but more generally not by a Bayer designation.
