= V4199 Sagittarii =

Star in the constellation Sagittarius

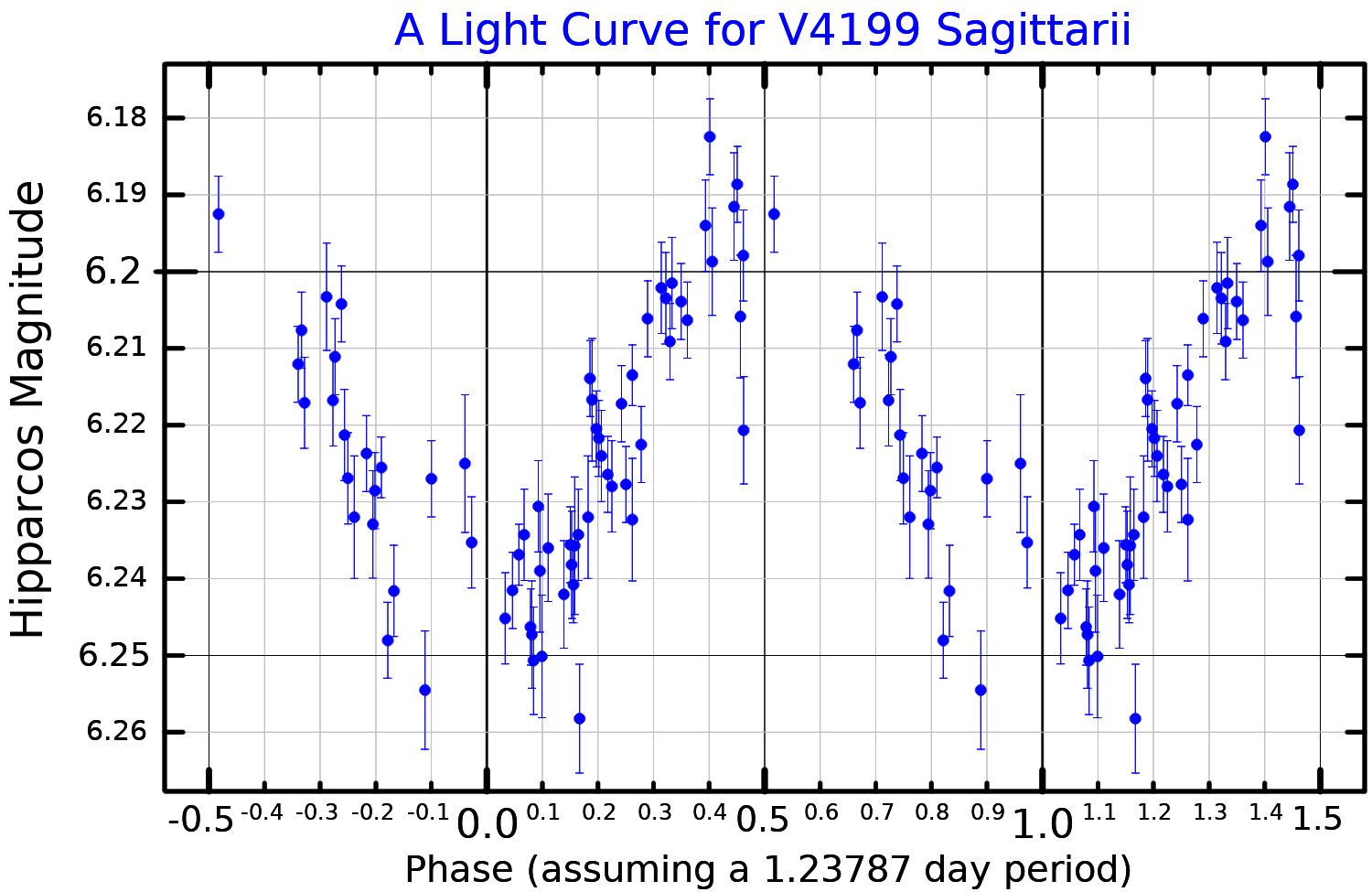
- A light curve for V4199 Sagittarii, plotted from Hipparcos data

Observation data Epoch J2000.0 Equinox ICRS
- Constellation: Sagittarius
- Right ascension: 19^{h} 21^{m} 37.11363^{s}
- Declination: −19° 14′ 04.0500″
- Apparent magnitude (V): 6.22 to 6.28

Characteristics
- Spectral type: B5III
- B−V color index: −0.091±0.004
- Variable type: SPB

Astrometry
Radial velocity (R_{v})	−23.3±7.4 km/s
Proper motion (μ)	RA: +3.135 mas/yr Dec.: −12.136 mas/yr
Parallax (π)	4.7371±0.0556 mas
Distance	689 ± 8 ly (211 ± 2 pc)
Absolute magnitude (M_{V})	−0.63

Details
Mass	4.2±0.3 M_{☉}
Radius	2.9±0.5 R_{☉}
Luminosity	316+82 −66 L_{☉}
Surface gravity (log g)	4.16±0.20 cgs
Temperature	14,700±700 K
Rotational velocity (v sin i)	6±4 km/s
Age	48.9±21.6 Myr

Other designations
- 173 G. Sagittarii, BD−19°5412, HD 181558, HIP 95159, HR 7339, SAO 162511, WDS 19216-1914

Database references
SIMBAD	data

V4199 Sagittarii is a variable star in the southern constellation of Sagittarius. It is a dim star that is just visible to the naked eye with an apparent visual magnitude that varies between 6.22 and 6.28 over a period of 1.23825 days. The star is located at a distance of approximately 689 light years from the Sun based on parallax, but is drifting closer with a radial velocity of roughly −23 km/s. It has an absolute magnitude of −0.63, on average.

The stellar classification of this star is B5III, matching a B-type giant star. In the Bright Star Catalogue it was listed as a main sequence star of class B5V, although the colors suggest a somewhat more evolved star. The photometric variability of this star was announced by C. Waelkens and F. Rufener in 1985. It is a multi-periodic slowly pulsating B star with a dominant frequency of 0.80780±0.00010 cycles/day. The star has four times the mass of the Sun and three times the Sun's radius. It is radiating ~316 times the luminosity of the Sun from its photosphere at an effective temperature of 14,700 K. A magnetic field has been detected on this star with a strength of −104±32 G.

It has a magnitude 9.96 companion star at an angular separation of 90.9″ along a position angle of 310°, as of 2003.
