= Lambda Columbae =

Variable star in the constellation Columba

λ Columbae
- Location of λ Columbae (circled in red)

Observation data Epoch J2000.0 Equinox J2000.0 (ICRS)
- Constellation: Columba
- Right ascension: 05^{h} 53^{m} 06.882^{s}
- Declination: −33° 48′ 04.91″
- Apparent magnitude (V): 4.88

Characteristics
- Evolutionary stage: main sequence
- Spectral type: B5 V
- U−B color index: −0.57
- B−V color index: −0.154±0.008
- Variable type: Suspected rotating ellipsoidal

Astrometry
Radial velocity (R_{v})	+30.0 km/s
Proper motion (μ)	RA: −4.095 mas/yr Dec.: +31.125 mas/yr
Parallax (π)	9.466±0.0901 mas
Distance	345 ± 3 ly (106 ± 1 pc)
Absolute magnitude (M_{V})	−0.17

Details
Mass	4.26±0.04 M_{☉}
Radius	2.72±0.06 R_{☉}
Luminosity	343±6 L_{☉}
Surface gravity (log g)	4.0513±0.009 cgs
Temperature	15,057+30 −25 K
Metallicity [Fe/H]	−0.06 dex
Rotational velocity (v sin i)	88 km/s
Age	56.6±26.1 Myr

Other designations
- λ Col, CD−33°2599, HD 39764, HIP 27810, HR 2056, SAO 196276

Database references
SIMBAD	data

Lambda Columbae is a probable binary star in the southern constellation of Columba. Its name is a Bayer designation that is Latinized from λ Columbae, and abbreviated Lambda Columbae or λ Col. With an apparent visual magnitude of 4.88, it is faintly visible to the naked eye. The measured annual parallax shift of 9.47 mas yields an estimated distance of approximately 345 light-years (106 pc). It is drifting further away from the Sun with a line of sight velocity component of +30 km/s.

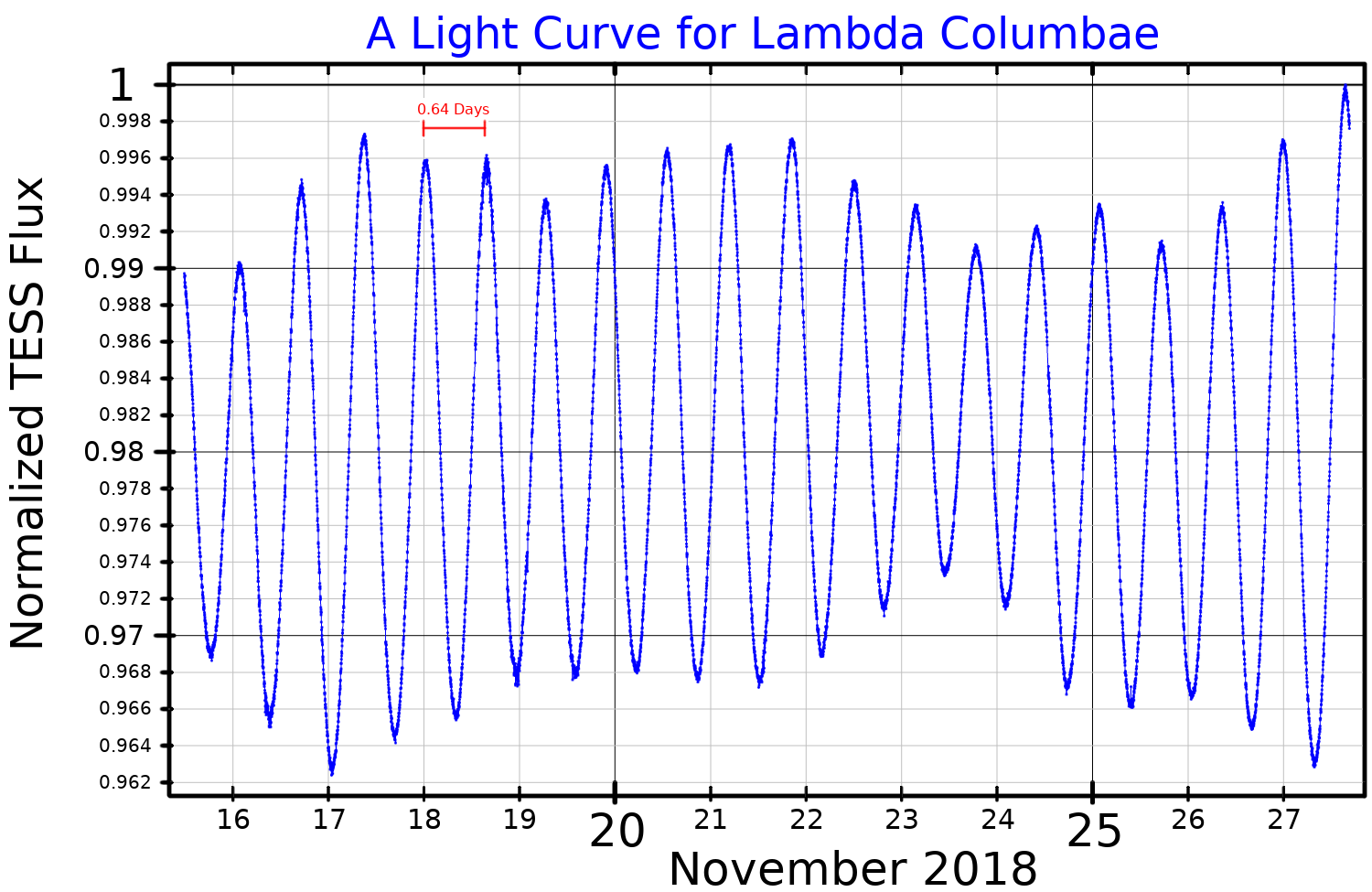
A light curve for Lambda Columbae, plotted from TESS data. The 0.64 day period is marked in red.

Lambda Columbae has a stellar classification of B5 V, indicating that it is a B-type main sequence star. It is a suspected rotating ellipsoidal variable with a period of 0.64 days and an amplitude of 0.07 magnitude. Confirmation would indicate that this is a close binary system.

This star has an estimated age of around 57 million years with a relatively high rate of spin, showing a projected rotational velocity of 88 km/s. It has 4.3 times the mass of the Sun and 2.7 times the Sun's radius. Lambda Columbae is radiating 343 times the luminosity of the Sun from its photosphere at an effective temperature of 15,057 K.

In Chinese, 子 (Zǐ), meaning Son, refers to an asterism consisting of λ Columbae and β Columbae. Consequently, λ Columbae itself is known as 子一 (Zǐ yī, English: the First Star of Son). From this Chinese name, the name Tsze is derived.
