= HD 25558 =

Variable star in the constellation Taurus

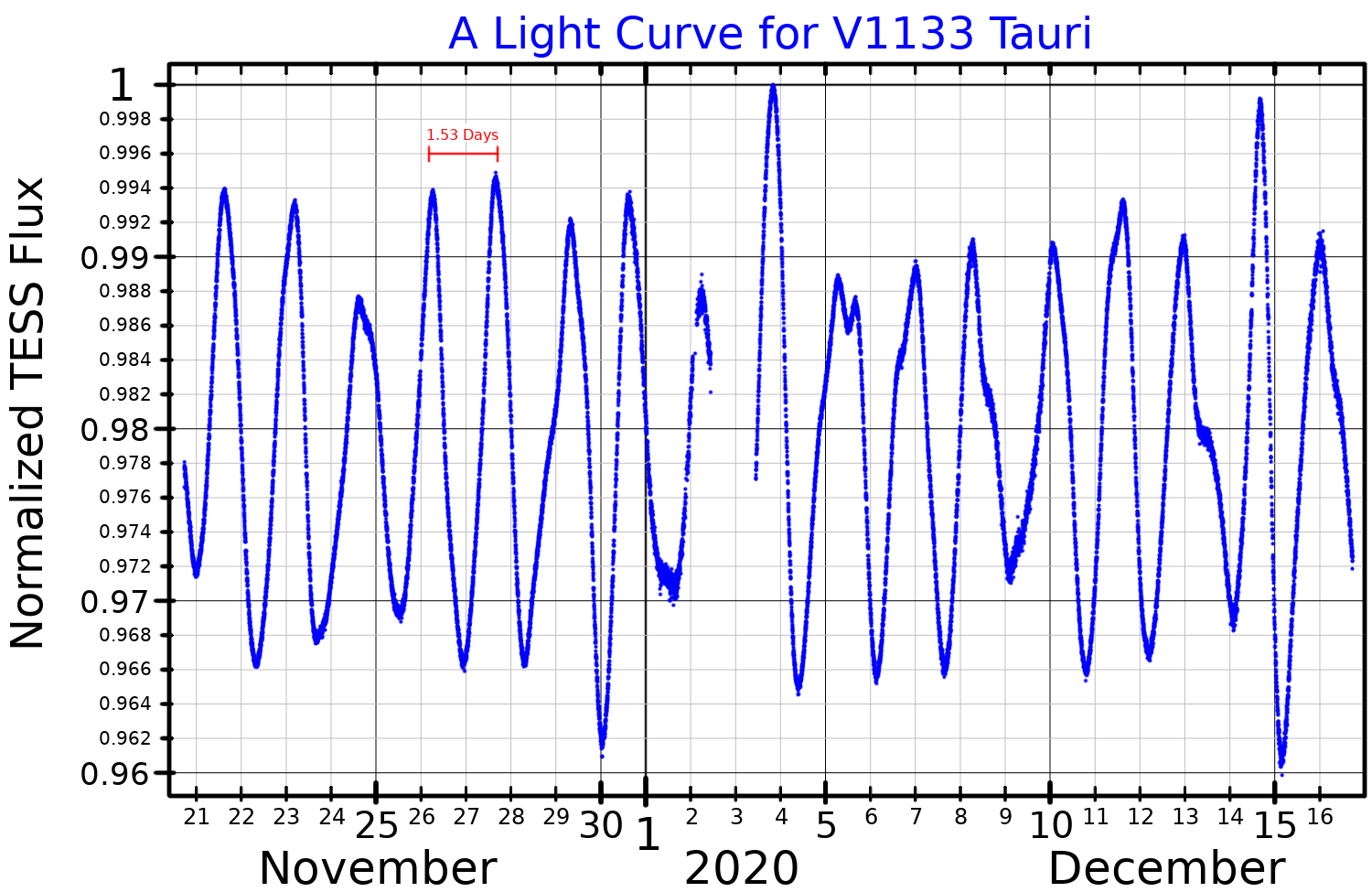
- A light curve for V1133 Tauri, plotted from TESS data. The 1.53 day period is marked in red.

Observation data Epoch J2000.0 Equinox ICRS
- Constellation: Taurus
- Right ascension: 04^{h} 03^{m} 44.60445^{s}
- Declination: +05° 26′ 08.2258″
- Apparent magnitude (V): +5.33

Characteristics
- Evolutionary stage: main sequence
- Spectral type: B3V
- Variable type: Slowly pulsating B

Astrometry
Proper motion (μ)	RA: 1.271±0.275 mas/yr Dec.: −7.216±0.201 mas/yr
Parallax (π)	4.5161±0.2637 mas
Distance	720 ± 40 ly (220 ± 10 pc)
Absolute magnitude (M_{V})	−1.2

Details

Primary
Mass	4.6 M_{☉}
Radius	2.4 (Note: The paper derives the period from the rotational velocity and the radius, but does not show the radius. The radius found can be calculated from the period and equatorial rotational velocity.) R_{☉}
Luminosity	560+530 −270 L_{☉}
Surface gravity (log g)	4.2±0.2 cgs
Temperature	16,850±800 K
Metallicity [Fe/H]	−0.3 dex
Rotation	5.9±2 d
Rotational velocity (v sin i)	21.5±1.5 km/s

Secondary
Mass	4.2 M_{☉}
Radius	2.9 R_{☉}
Luminosity	420+540 −230 L_{☉}
Surface gravity (log g)	4.25±0.25 cgs
Temperature	16,250±1,000 K
Metallicity [Fe/H]	−0.3 dex
Rotation	1.2±0.6 d
Rotational velocity (v sin i)	35±4 km/s
Age	40-55 Myr

Other designations
- 40 Tauri, V1133 Tau, BD+05 584, HIP 18957, HR 1253, SAO 111585

Database references
SIMBAD	data

HD 25558, also known as V1133 Tauri and by its Flamsteed designation 40 Tauri, is a star located about 700 light years from the Earth, in the constellation Taurus. Its apparent magnitude is about 5.3, making it faintly visible to the naked eye of an observer far from city lights. It is a variable star, ranging in brightness from Hipparcos magnitude 5.28 to 5.32 over a period of 1.53232423 days.

In 1998, HD 25558 was discovered to be a variable star by Christoffel Waelkens et al. who analyzed the Hipparcos photometric data for hundreds of stars, and classified HD 25558 as a slowly pulsating B star with a period of 1.53 days.

Beginning in 2008, HD 25558 was the subject of an observing campaign by Ádám Sódor et al. who gathered data collected from 17 observatories on the ground and in space. This star was chosen for the project because it is relatively bright, located near the celestial equator (and thus observable from almost anywhere on Earth), and the slow rotation indicated in earlier studies would simplify the interpretation of spectra. The investigators concluded that HD 25558 is a spectroscopic binary with a period of about 8.9 years, but not enough data was available to derive a full description of the orbit. Both components of the binary show detectable stellar pulsations. The primary star rotates with a period of about 6 days, and the secondary rotates in just 1.2 days. The primary has no detectable magnetic field, but the secondary's field strength is at least a few hundred gauss. The dominant 1.53 day pulsation period arises from the primary star and those pulsations were coherent over the 20 year period spanned by the data used in the study.
