= General Catalogue of Variable Stars =

List of variable stars

The General Catalogue of Variable Stars (GCVS) is a list of variable stars in the Milky Way Galaxy. (Note: The fourth edition also included a list of extragalactic variable stars, but the fifth edition is no longer updating it.) Its first edition, containing 10,820 stars, was published in 1948 by the Academy of Sciences of the USSR, edited by Boris Kukarkin and Pavel Parenago. Second and third editions were published in 1958 and 1968. The fourth edition, containing 28,435 stars, was published in three volumes in 1985–1987. Later, two more volumes were published: the fourth volume containing reference tables and the fifth volume containing extragalactic variable stars. The first release of the fifth edition (GCVS 5.1), which is periodically updated, currently contains 58,035 variable stars; it is available at the GCVS website and at the VizieR astronomical catalogue service.

Prior to the widespread use of photography in astronomy, new variable stars were discovered at a slow pace, and they were simply added to lists. In the late 19th century photographic programs, especially at the Harvard College Observatory, led to a rapid increase in the number of known variable stars. In the 1920s, the variable star commission of the German Astronomische Gesellschaft began the annual publication of a catalogue of variable stars. The last of these catalogues, published in 1943, contained 9476 stars. After World War II, the IAU moved the responsibility for the variable star catalogue to the Soviet Union. In 1994 the IAU stopped financially supporting the production of the GCVS.

The acquisition of data from gravitational lensing studies and space-based missions has resulted in the discovery of thousands of new variable stars. For example, in 1996, data on 5665 variable stars discovered by the Hipparcos mission were sent to the Russian group maintaining the GCVS.

== Versions ==
3

- Kukarkin, B. V.; Kholopov, P. N.; Pskovsky, Y. P.; Efremov, Y. N.; Kukarkina, N. P.; Kurochkin, N. E.; Medvedeva, G. I. (1971). "The third edition containing information on 20437 variable stars discovered and designated till 1968". General Catalogue of Variable Stars. Bibcode:1971GCVS3.C......0K.

4.2

- Samus, N. N.; Durlevich, O. V.; et al. (2004). "VizieR Online Data Catalog: Combined General Catalogue of Variable Stars (Samus+ 2004)". Vizier Online Data Catalog. Bibcode:2004yCat.2250....0S.

5.1

- Samus, N. N.; Kazarovets, E. V.; Durlevich, O. V.; Kireeva, N. N.; Pastukhova, E. N. (2017). "General catalogue of variable stars: Version GCVS 5.1". Astronomy Reports. 61 (1): 80. Bibcode:2017ARep...61...80S. doi:10.1134/S1063772917010085.

Supplements

- Kazarovets, E. V.; Samus, N. N.; Durlevich, O. V. (1998). "New Catalogue of Suspected Variable Stars. Supplement - Version 1.0". Information Bulletin on Variable Stars. 4655: 1. Bibcode:1998IBVS.4655....1K.
- Kazarovets, E. V.; Samus, N. N.; Durlevich, O. V. (2022). "Revised Version of the New Catalogue of Suspected Variable Stars, NSV Release 2". Astronomy Reports. 66 (7): 555–560. Bibcode:2022ARep...66..555K. doi:10.1134/S1063772922080066.
