= Gamma Eridani =

Variable star in the constellation Eridanus

γ Eridani
- Location of γ Eridani (circled)

Observation data Epoch J2000.0 Equinox ICRS
- Constellation: Eridanus
- Right ascension: 03^{h} 58^{m} 01.76695^{s}
- Declination: −13° 30′ 30.6698″
- Apparent magnitude (V): 2.88 - 2.96

Characteristics
- Evolutionary stage: AGB
- Spectral type: M0III-IIIb
- U−B color index: +1.96
- B−V color index: +1.58
- Variable type: Lb?

Astrometry
Radial velocity (R_{v})	60.81±0.25 km/s
Proper motion (μ)	RA: +61.57 mas/yr Dec.: −113.11 mas/yr
Parallax (π)	17.0016±0.2254 mas
Distance	192 ± 3 ly (58.8 ± 0.8 pc)
Absolute magnitude (M_{V})	−1.19

Details
Mass	1.55 M_{☉}
Radius	58.7±0.8 R_{☉}
Luminosity	634.2±28.6 L_{☉}
Surface gravity (log g)	1.52 cgs
Temperature	3,779±34 K
Metallicity [Fe/H]	+0.00 dex
Rotational velocity (v sin i)	3.8 km/s

Other designations
- Zaurak, γ Eri, 34 Eri, BD−13 781, HD 25025, HIP 18543, HR 1231, SAO 149283

Database references
SIMBAD	data

Gamma Eridani (γ Eridani, abbreviated Gamma Eri, γ Eri), formally named Zaurak /ˈzɔːræk/, is a variable star in the constellation of Eridanus. It is visible to the naked eye with an apparent visual magnitude that varies around 2.9, and lies at a distance of about 203 light years from the Sun, as determined by the Hipparcos astrometry satellite.

== Description ==
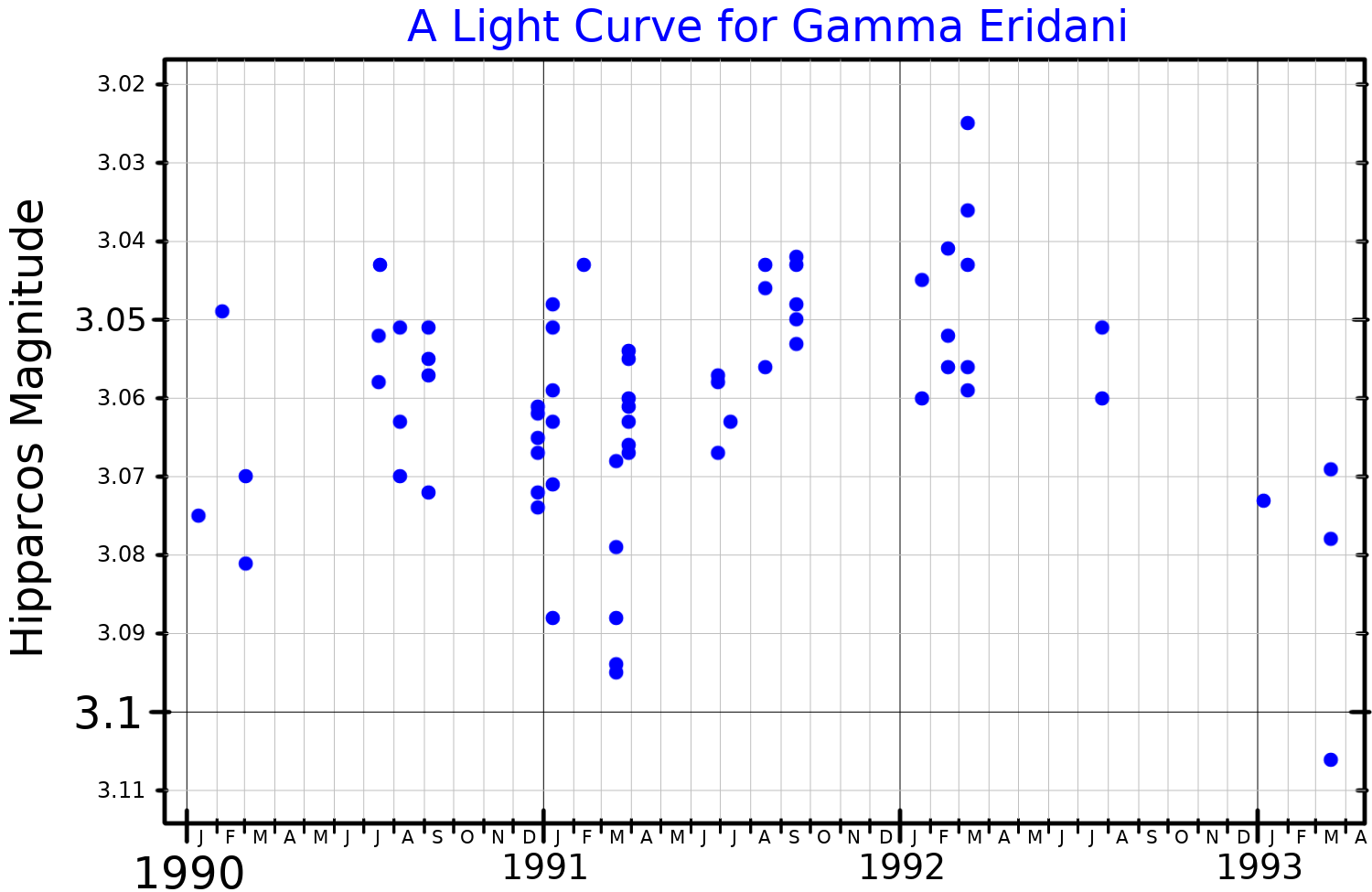
A light curve for Gama Eridani, plotted from Hipparcos data

Gamma Eridani has been defined as a standard star for the spectral class M0III-IIIb. It is a red giant on the asymptotic giant branch, fusing hydrogen and helium in separate shells outside its core. Observations published in 1960 showed it to vary in brightness by a few hundredths of a magnitude. In 1977, it was officially listed as a variable star in the General Catalogue of Variable Stars although the class of variable is uncertain.

The Gaia EDR3 data identified a comoving 0.1 M_{☉} companion star of Gamma Eridani, at a projected separation of 1000 AU. It is likely that there is an additional red dwarf companion that at a distance within 50 AU, too close to resolve from the primary.

== Nomenclature ==
Gamma Eridani is the star's Bayer designation. It has the traditional name Zaurak, alternatively spelled Zaurac, which is one of the Arabic words for 'boat'. In 2016, the International Astronomical Union organized a Working Group on Star Names (WGSN) to catalog and standardize proper names for stars. The WGSN's first bulletin of July 2016 included a table of the first two batches of names approved by the WGSN; which included Zaurak for this star.

In Chinese, 天苑 (Tiān Yuàn), meaning Celestial Meadows, refers to an asterism consisting of γ Eridani, δ Eridani, π Eridani, ε Eridani, ζ Eridani, η Eridani, π Ceti, τ^{1} Eridani, τ^{2} Eridani, τ^{3} Eridani, τ^{4} Eridani, τ^{5} Eridani, τ^{6} Eridani, τ^{7} Eridani, τ^{8} Eridani and τ^{9} Eridani. Consequently, the Chinese name for γ Eridani itself is 天苑一 (Tiān Yuàn yī, English: the First [Star] of Celestial Meadows.)

USS Zaurak (AK-117) was a United States Navy Crater class cargo ship named after the star.
