= Tau2 Eridani =

Star in the constellation Eridanus

τ^{2} Eridani
- Location of τ^{2} Eridani (circled in red)

Observation data Epoch J2000.0 Equinox ICRS
- Constellation: Eridanus
- Right ascension: 02^{h} 51^{m} 02.32186^{s}
- Declination: −21° 00′ 14.4654″
- Apparent magnitude (V): 4.78

Characteristics
- Evolutionary stage: red clump
- Spectral type: K0 III
- U−B color index: +0.63
- B−V color index: +0.92

Astrometry
Radial velocity (R_{v})	−5.9 km/s
Proper motion (μ)	RA: −38.52 mas/yr Dec.: −16.05 mas/yr
Parallax (π)	17.45±0.20 mas
Distance	187 ± 2 ly (57.3 ± 0.7 pc)
Absolute magnitude (M_{V})	1.008

Details
Mass	2.39±0.03 M_{☉}
Radius	8.85±0.08 R_{☉}
Luminosity	44.36±0.8 L_{☉}
Surface gravity (log g)	2.95±0.03 cgs
Temperature	5,049±20 K
Metallicity [Fe/H]	0.08±0.06 dex
Rotational velocity (v sin i)	1.11 km/s
Age	720±50 Myr

Other designations
- Angetenar, τ^{2} Eridani, 2 Eri, BD−21°509, HD 17824, HIP 13288, HR 850, SAO 168094

Database references
SIMBAD	data

Tau^{2} Eridani (τ^{2} Eridani, abbreviated Tau^{2} Eri, τ^{2} Eri), formally named Angetenar /æŋˈɡɛtənɑːr/, is a star in the constellation of Eridanus. It is visible to the naked eye with an apparent visual magnitude of 4.78. The distance to this star, as determined via the parallax method, is around 187 light-years.

== Nomenclature ==
τ^{2} Eridani (Latinised to Tau^{2} Eridani) is the system's Bayer designation. It is one of a series of stars that share the Bayer designation Tau Eridani.

It bore the traditional name Angetenar, derived from the Arabic Al Ḥināyat an-Nahr, 'the Bend in the River', near which it lies. In 2016, the IAU organized a Working Group on Star Names (WGSN) to catalog and standardize proper names for stars. The WGSN approved the name Angetenar for this star on 30 June 2017 and it is now so included in the List of IAU-approved Star Names.

In Chinese, 天苑 (Tiān Yuàn), meaning Celestial Meadows, refers to an asterism consisting of Tau^{2} Eridani, Gamma Eridani, Pi Eridani, Delta Eridani, Epsilon Eridani, Zeta Eridani, Eta Eridani, Pi Ceti, Tau^{1} Eridani, Tau^{3} Eridani, Tau^{4} Eridani, Tau^{5} Eridani, Tau^{6} Eridani, Tau^{7} Eridani, Tau^{8} Eridani and Tau^{9} Eridani. Consequently, the Chinese name for Tau^{2} Eridani itself is 天苑九 (Tiān Yuàn jiǔ, English: the Ninth Star of Celestial Meadows.)

== Properties ==
Tau^{2} Eridani is an evolved K-type giant star with a stellar classification of K0 III. It is a red clump giant on the horizontal branch of the Hertzsprung–Russell diagram, indicating that is it now generating energy through the thermonuclear fusion of helium at its core.

Around 720 million years old, Tau^{2} Eridani has 2.4 times the mass of the Sun and has expanded to over 8 times the solar radius. It shines with nearly 44 times the Sun's luminosity from an outer atmosphere that has an effective temperature of 5,049 K.

It is a member of the Galactic thin disk population.
