= Delta Eridani =

Star in the constellation Eridanus

δ Eridani / Rana
- Location of δ Eridani (circled)

Observation data Epoch J2000 Equinox ICRS
- Constellation: Eridanus
- Right ascension: 03^{h} 43^{m} 14.90054^{s}
- Declination: −09° 45′ 48.2110″
- Apparent magnitude (V): 3.53

Characteristics
- Evolutionary stage: Subgiant
- Spectral type: K0 IV
- U−B color index: +0.69
- B−V color index: +0.92
- Variable type: none

Astrometry
Radial velocity (R_{v})	−6.28±0.09 km/s
Proper motion (μ)	RA: −93.634 mas/yr Dec.: +744.360 mas/yr
Parallax (π)	110.0254±0.1944 mas
Distance	29.64 ± 0.05 ly (9.09 ± 0.02 pc)
Absolute magnitude (M_{V})	3.77

Details
Mass	1.215 M_{☉}
Radius	2.35±0.01 R_{☉}
Luminosity	3.17±0.09 L_{☉}
Surface gravity (log g)	3.66±0.1 cgs
Temperature	5,027±48 K
Metallicity [Fe/H]	+0.07±0.03 dex
Rotational velocity (v sin i)	0.7±0.6 km/s
Age	6.194 Gyr

Other designations
- Rana, δ Eri, 23 Eridani, NSV 1246, BD−10°728, GJ 150, HD 23249, HIP 17378, HR 1136, SAO 130686, LHS 1581

Database references
SIMBAD	data

Delta Eridani, Latinized from δ Eridani, also named Rana, is the fifth-brightest star in the constellation of Eridanus.

The star is visible to the naked eye with an apparent magnitude of 3.54. It is relatively near to the Sun, with a distance of about 29.6 light-years as determined from parallax. The star is drifting closer with a radial velocity of −6 km/s.

== Nomenclature ==
Delta Eridani is sometimes called Rana; Rana means frog in Latin. This name first appeared as Rana Secunda, the "second frog", in Giuseppe Piazzi's star catalogue; this was likely a misattributed name for Beta Ceti (Diphda), known as the "second frog" in Arabic. The name Rana was approved by the IAU Working Group on Star Names on 4 April 2022.

In Chinese, 天苑 (Tiān Yuàn), meaning Celestial Meadows, refers to an asterism consisting of δ Eridani, γ Eridani, π Eridani, ε Eridani, ζ Eridani, η Eridani, π Ceti, τ^{1} Eridani, τ^{2} Eridani, τ^{3} Eridani, τ^{4} Eridani, τ^{5} Eridani, τ^{6} Eridani, τ^{7} Eridani, τ^{8} Eridani and τ^{9} Eridani. Consequently, the Chinese name for δ Eridani itself is 天苑三 (Tiān Yuàn sān, English: the Third Star of Celestial Meadows.)

== Characteristics ==
The stellar classification of this star is K0 IV, matching a subgiant star that has exhausted its core hydrogen. This has caused the star to expand and become cooler than a comparable main sequence star. Stellar modelling indicates it is near the end of the subgiant stage and about to transition into a giant. It is an estimated six billion years old with 33% more mass than the Sun. The star has 2.35 times the size of the Sun and is radiating three times the Sun's luminosity from its photosphere at an effective temperature of 5,027 K.

Delta Eridani was catalogued as a suspected RS Canum Venaticorum variable in 1983, varying slightly in brightness between magnitudes 3.51 and 3.56, although subsequent observations did not bear this out and an examination of the star using interferometry did not detect the presence of a companion at the expected distance. Thus, this classification is now considered erroneous. The star has a very low level of chromospheric activity. A low projected rotational velocity of under 1 km/s and the lack of radial velocity variation suggest that this star is being viewed from nearly pole-on.

== See also ==
- List of star systems within 25–30 light-years
- List of nearest K-type stars
