= Pi Ceti =

Spectroscopic binary star system in the constellation Cetus

- Location of Pi Ceti (circled)

Observation data Epoch J2000 Equinox ICRS
- Constellation: Cetus
- Right ascension: 02^{h} 44^{m} 07.348^{s}
- Declination: −13° 51′ 31.28″
- Apparent magnitude (V): 4.238

Characteristics
- Evolutionary stage: main sequence
- Spectral type: B7 V or B7 IV
- U−B color index: −0.396
- B−V color index: −0.130

Astrometry
Radial velocity (R_{v})	14.98±0.25 km/s
Proper motion (μ)	RA: −8.394 mas/yr Dec.: −23.592 mas/yr
Parallax (π)	8.4022±0.1945 mas
Distance	360+16 −13 ly (109+5 −4 pc)
Absolute magnitude (M_{V})	−1.16

Orbit
Period (P)	2,722±14 d
Eccentricity (e)	0.00±0.07
Periastron epoch (T)	2444852±29 JD
Argument of periastron (ω) (secondary)	0.0°
Semi-amplitude (K_{1}) (primary)	4.33±0.25 km/s

Details

π Cet A
Mass	4.0±0.1 M_{☉}
Radius	4.0±0.2 R_{☉}
Luminosity	398+28 −27 L_{☉}
Surface gravity (log g)	3.83±0.03 cgs
Temperature	12,819±76 K
Metallicity [Fe/H]	+0.28±0.16 dex
Rotational velocity (v sin i)	19.9±0.1 km/s
Age	155+36 −35 Myr

Other designations
- π Cet, 89 Ceti, BD−14 519, FK5 97, HD 17081, HIP 12770, HR 811, SAO 148575

Database references
SIMBAD	data

Pi Ceti a binary star system in the equatorial constellation of Cetus. Its name is a Bayer designation that is Latinized from π Ceti, and abbreviated Pi Cet or π Cet. The system is located near the eastern boundary of the constellation and is sometimes portrayed as forming part of the neighbouring constellation Eridanus, as on the diagram at right. It is visible to the naked eye as a point of light with an apparent visual magnitude of 4.238. Spectroscopic measurements indicate a distance of approximately 360 light-years (109 parsecs). The system is drifting further away from the Sun with a line of sight velocity component of +15 km/s.

This is a single-lined spectroscopic binary system with a nearly circular orbit and a period of 7.45 years. The fact that the system has a negligible eccentricity is surprising for such a long period, and may suggest that the secondary is a white dwarf that had its orbit circularized during a mass-transfer event.

The primary, component A, is a B-type star that has been given stellar classifications of B7 V and B7 IV. The star shows no magnetic field but it does emit an infrared excess.

== Name ==
This star, along with ε Cet, ρ Cet and σ Cet, was Al Sufi's Al Sadr al Ḳaiṭos, the Whale's breast/chest (upper torso). Per Jack Rhoads's Reduced Star Catalog Containing 537 Named Stars, Al Sufi's numerically ordered stars (1 to 4), were ρ (rho), σ (sigma), ε (epsilon) and this star.

In Chinese, 天苑 (Tiān Yuàn), meaning Celestial Meadows, refers to an asterism consisting of π Ceti, and 15 stars in Eridanus: γ, π, δ, ε, ζ, η, and the string of τ (Tau)^{1}, ^{2}, ^{3}, ^{4}, ^{5}, ^{6}, ^{7}, ^{8} and ^{9}. Consequently, the Chinese name for the star is 天苑七 (Tiān Yuàn qī) meaning Celestial Meadows: seven.
