= Eta Eridani =

Star in the constellation Eridanus

η Eridani
- Location of η Eridani (circled)

Observation data Epoch J2000.0 Equinox ICRS
- Constellation: Eridanus
- Right ascension: 02^{h} 56^{m} 25.64948^{s}
- Declination: −08° 53′ 53.3221″
- Apparent magnitude (V): +3.87

Characteristics
- Evolutionary stage: red clump
- Spectral type: K1+ IIIb
- U−B color index: _0.98
- B−V color index: +1.12
- Variable type: suspected

Astrometry
Radial velocity (R_{v})	−20.32 km/s
Proper motion (μ)	RA: +77.36 ± 0.19 mas/yr Dec.: −220.16 ± 0.20 mas/yr
Parallax (π)	23.89±0.19 mas
Distance	137 ± 1 ly (41.9 ± 0.3 pc)
Absolute magnitude (M_{V})	+0.83

Details
Mass	1.43 M_{☉}
Radius	10.48 R_{☉}
Luminosity	57.5 L_{☉}
Surface gravity (log g)	+2.79 cgs
Temperature	4,742 K
Rotational velocity (v sin i)	2.34 km/s
Age	2.66 Gyr

Other designations
- Azha, η Eri, 3 Eridani, NSV 988, HR 874, HD 18322, BD−09°533, HIP 13701

Database references
SIMBAD	data

Eta Eridani (η Eridani, abbreviated Eta Eri, η Eri), officially named Azha (with a silent 'h', possibly /ˈeɪzə/), is a giant star in the constellation of Eridanus. Based on parallax measurements taken during the Hipparcos mission, it is approximately 137 light-years from the Sun.

== Nomenclature ==
η Eridani (Latinised to Eta Eridani) is the star's Bayer designation.

It bore the traditional name Azha, from the old Arab asterism نَعَام أُدْحِيّ udḥiyy al-naʽām "the ostrich nest" (or "hatching place"), which included Eta Eridani. The first word, ادحى udḥiyy, was miscopied as ازحى (readable as azḥā) in medieval manuscripts. In 2016, the International Astronomical Union organized a Working Group on Star Names (WGSN) to catalogue and standardize proper names for stars. The WGSN approved the name Azha for this star on 12 September 2016 and it is now so included in the List of IAU-approved Star Names.

In Chinese, 天苑 (Tiān Yuàn), meaning Celestial Meadows, refers to an asterism consisting of Eta Eridani, Gamma Eridani, Pi Eridani, Delta Eridani, Epsilon Eridani, Zeta Eridani, Pi Ceti, Tau1 Eridani, Tau2 Eridani, Tau3 Eridani, Tau4 Eridani, Tau5 Eridani, Tau6 Eridani, Tau7 Eridani, Tau8 Eridani and Tau9 Eridani. Consequently, the Chinese name for Eta Eridani itself is 天苑六 (Tiān Yuàn liù, English: the Sixth Star of Celestial Meadows).

== Properties ==
η Eridani belongs to spectral class K3 and has a giant luminosity class. It is an evolved star that has expanded to tens times the size of the sun and nearly sixty times its luminosity. It is red clump giant, a star slightly more massive than the sun which is currently fusing helium in its core. This is a mild barium star, sometimes referred to a "semi-barium" star. Although most barium stars are in binary systems, η Eridani has no known companion.

η Eridani is a high proper motion star, a relatively close star that is moving across the sky at a high rate compared to most stars. It is suspected to be a variable star with a range from magnitude 3.81 to 3.90.
