= Tau Eridani =

Location of τ Eridani stars (circled)

Tau Eridani (τ Eridani, τ Eri) is a group of fairly widely scattered stars in the constellation Eridanus.

- τ^{1} Eridani (1 Eridani)
- τ^{2} Eridani (2 Eridani)
- τ^{3} Eridani (11 Eridani)
- τ^{4} Eridani (16 Eridani)
- τ^{5} Eridani (19 Eridani)
- τ^{6} Eridani (27 Eridani)
- τ^{7} Eridani (28 Eridani)
- τ^{8} Eridani (33 Eridani)
- τ^{9} Eridani (36 Eridani)

Because of the large separation of the stars, sometimes they were not designated like above. For example, in Lacaille’s catalogue, τ^{6} was designated n, τ^{7} was designated m, and τ^{9} was designated k. In Bode’s catalog, only τ^{1} and ^{2} were designated Tau. τ^{3} was designated E, τ^{4} was designated j, τ^{5} was designated t, τ^{6,7} were designated m, and τ^{8,9} was designated l. These designations were not upheld and reverted to the chain of Tau stars. All of them were member of asterism 天苑 (Tiān Yuàn), Celestial Meadows, Hairy Head mansion .
