= Rho Ceti =

A-type main sequence star in the constellation Cetus

- Location of ρ Ceti (circled in red)

Observation data Epoch J2000.0 Equinox J2000.0 (ICRS)
- Constellation: Cetus
- Right ascension: 02^{h} 25^{m} 57.006^{s}
- Declination: −12° 17′ 25.708″
- Apparent magnitude (V): 4.885

Characteristics
- Evolutionary stage: subgiant
- Spectral type: A0 V
- U−B color index: +0.001
- B−V color index: −0.037

Astrometry
Radial velocity (R_{v})	+18.9±2.0 km/s
Proper motion (μ)	RA: −11.596 mas/yr Dec.: −9.786 mas/yr
Parallax (π)	5.8054±0.1358 mas
Distance	560 ± 10 ly (172 ± 4 pc)
Absolute magnitude (M_{V})	−0.85

Details
Mass	2.3 M_{☉}
Radius	6.3 R_{☉}
Luminosity	328 L_{☉}
Surface gravity (log g)	3.56 cgs
Temperature	9,505 K
Rotational velocity (v sin i)	219 km/s
Age	72 Myr

Other designations
- Chugao, ρ Cet, 72 Cet, BD−12°451, FK5 1066, HD 15130, HIP 11345, HR 708, SAO 148385

Database references
SIMBAD	data

Rho Ceti, also named Chugao, is a star in the equatorial constellation of Cetus. This star is faintly visible to the naked eye with an apparent visual magnitude of 4.885. The distance to this star, based upon an annual parallax shift of 5.81 mas, is around 560 light years. It is drifting further away with a line of sight velocity component of +19 km/s.

== Nomenclature ==
Rho Ceti is a Bayer designation that is Latinized from ρ Ceti, and abbreviated Rho Cet or ρ Cet.

This star, along with π Cet, ε Cet and σ Cet, was Al Sufi's Al Sadr al Ḳaiṭos, the Whale's Breast. According to the catalogue of stars in the Technical Memorandum 33-507 - A Reduced Star Catalog Containing 537 Named Stars, Al Sadr al Ḳaiṭos were the title for four stars: this star (ρ Cet) as Al Sadr al Ḳaiṭos I, σ Cet as Al Sadr al Ḳaiṭos II, ε Cet as Al Sadr al Ḳaiṭos III and π Cet as Al Sadr al Ḳaiṭos IV.

In Chinese astronomy, 芻蒿 (Chú Gāo), meaning Hay, refers to an asterism consisting of ρ Ceti, 77 Ceti, 67 Ceti, 71 Ceti, HD 14691 and ε Cet. Consequently, the Chinese name for ρ Ceti itself is 芻蒿一 (Chú Gāo yī, English: the First Star of Celestial Meadows. The IAU Working Group on Star Names adopted the name Chugao for ρ Ceti on 15 October 2026.

== Properties ==
This star has a stellar classification of A0 V, which is presenting as an A-type main sequence star. However, it may be in the subgiant stage of its evolution. It is spinning rapidly with a projected rotational velocity of 219 km/s, giving the star an oblate shape with an equatorial bulge that is 10% larger than the polar radius. The star has an estimated size 6.3 times the radius of the Sun and is radiating 328 times the solar luminosity from its outer atmosphere at an effective temperature of 9,505 K.
