= Rho Eridani =

Location of ρ Eridani (circled)

The Bayer designation ρ Eridani (Rho Eridani, ρ Eri) is shared by three stars in the constellation Eridanus that lie in a line:

- ρ^{1} Eridani (8 Eridani)
- ρ^{2} Eridani (9 Eridani)
- ρ^{3} Eridani (10 Eridani)

Johann Bode later applied ρ^{4} to the star HD 19349, however it was not widely adopted and disused afterwards.
