= Epsilon Ceti =

Binary star system in the constellation Cetus

- Location of ε Ceti (circled in red)

Observation data Epoch J2000.0 Equinox J2000.0 (ICRS)
- Constellation: Cetus
- Right ascension: 02^{h} 39^{m} 33.79741^{s}
- Declination: −11° 52′ 19.5516″
- Apparent magnitude (V): +4.84

Characteristics
- Evolutionary stage: main sequence
- Spectral type: F2V + F7/G4V
- U−B color index: −0.02
- B−V color index: +0.45

Astrometry
Radial velocity (R_{v})	15.49±0.19 km/s
Proper motion (μ)	RA: +167.071 mas/yr Dec.: −251.104 mas/yr
Parallax (π)	41.43±0.68 mas
Distance	79 ± 1 ly (24.1 ± 0.4 pc)
Absolute magnitude (M_{V})	+2.68

Orbit
Period (P)	2.6512±0.0005 yr
Semi-major axis (a)	0.1063±0.0005″
Eccentricity (e)	0.230±0.001
Inclination (i)	24.2±0.2°
Longitude of the node (Ω)	90.2±0.2°
Periastron epoch (T)	2,012.3109±0.0005
Argument of periastron (ω) (secondary)	40.8±0.2°

Details

ε Cet A
Mass	1.37±0.09 M_{☉}
Radius	1.52 R_{☉}
Surface gravity (log g)	4.21±0.14 cgs
Temperature	6,520 K
Metallicity [Fe/H]	−0.08 dex
Rotational velocity (v sin i)	11.5 km/s
Age	1.8 Gyr

ε Cet B
Mass	1.03±0.08 M_{☉}
Radius	1.27 R_{☉}
Temperature	6,370 K
Metallicity [Fe/H]	−0.08 dex
Rotational velocity (v sin i)	2.0 km/s

Other designations
- ε Cet, 83 Cet, BD−12°501, GJ 9091, GJ 105.4, HD 16620, HIP 12390, HR 781, SAO 148528

Database references
SIMBAD	data

Epsilon Ceti is a binary star system located in the equatorial constellation of Cetus. Its name is a Bayer designation that is Latinized from ε Ceti and abbreviated Epsilon Cet or ε Cet. This system is faintly visible to the naked eye as a point of light with an apparent visual magnitude of +4.84. Based upon an annual parallax shift of 41.43 mas, it is located around 79 light-years away from the Sun.

This is a line-width spectroscopic binary star system. It has an orbital period of 2.65 years and an eccentricity of 0.23. The semimajor axis is 0.11 AU, or 11% of the distance between the Sun and the Earth, and the orbital plane is inclined at an angle of 24.2° to the plane of the sky.

The primary member, component A, is an F-type main-sequence star with a stellar classification of F2 V. The spectrum of the secondary, component B, can not be readily separated from that of the primary, so its type can only be estimated as a main-sequence star lying in the range between F7 V and G4 V. The system is estimated to be 1.8 billion years old, with the primary having 1.4 times the mass of the Sun and the secondary being about equal to the Sun's mass.

== Name ==
This star, along with π Cet, ρ Cet and σ Cet, was Al Sufi's Al Sadr al Ḳaiṭos, the Whale's Breast.

According to the catalogue of stars in the Technical Memorandum 33-507 - A Reduced Star Catalog Containing 537 Named Stars, Al Sadr al Ḳaiṭos were the title for four stars: ρ Cet as Al Sadr al Ḳaiṭos I, σ Cet as Al Sadr al Ḳaiṭos II, this star (ε Cet) as Al Sadr al Ḳaiṭos III and π Cet as Al Sadr al Ḳaiṭos IV.

In Chinese, 芻蒿 (Chú Hāo), meaning Hay, refers to an asterism consisting of ε Ceti, ρ Ceti, 77 Ceti, 67 Ceti, 71 Ceti and HD 14691. Consequently, the Chinese name for ε Ceti itself is 芻蒿六 (Chú Hāo liù, English: the Sixth Star of Celestial Meadows).
