= HD 17943 =

High proper-motion star in Eridanus

- Location of HD 17943 (circled)

Observation data Epoch J2000 Equinox ICRS
- Constellation: Eridanus
- Right ascension: 02^{h} 52^{m} 50.74^{s}
- Declination: −09° 26′ 28.4″
- Apparent magnitude (V): 6.325

Characteristics
- Evolutionary stage: main-sequence star
- Spectral type: A4V

Astrometry
Radial velocity (R_{v})	38.07±0.28 km/s
Proper motion (μ)	RA: +109.825 mas/yr Dec.: +40.094 mas/yr
Parallax (π)	10.6465±0.0374 mas
Distance	306 ± 1 ly (93.9 ± 0.3 pc)
Absolute magnitude (M_{V})	1.37

Details
Mass	1.8 M_{☉}
Radius	2.6 R_{☉}
Luminosity	21 L_{☉}
Surface gravity (log g)	3.88 cgs
Temperature	7,749 K
Metallicity [Fe/H]	−0.01 dex
Rotational velocity (v sin i)	134 km/s
Age	735 Myr

Other designations
- BD−10 569, HD 17943, HIP 13421, HR 859, SAO 130160, TYC 5286-1109-1, 33 G. Eridani

Database references
SIMBAD	data

HD 17943, or HR 859, is a high proper-motion star in the constellation of Eridanus. It has an apparent magnitude of 6.325. Based on parallax measurements from the Gaia spacecraft, it is at a distance of 306 light-years (94 parsecs). It belongs to spectral class A4V.

This star is incorrectly called by the Bayer designation Sigma Eridani in the 1991 edition of the Bright Star Catalogue. Bayer's Sigma Eridani is in fact non-existent; he assigned this designation to a 4th-magnitude-star near Eta Eridani, on the opposite side to Rho Eridani, but no naked-eye star is found in that position in modern star atlases.
