= William I. McLaughlin =

American space scientist

William I. McLaughlin (1935-May 31, 2025) was an American space scientist.

After being awarded his PhD in mathematics at the University of California at Berkeley in 1968 (with a thesis on celestial mechanics), he worked at Bellcomm, Inc. in Washington D.C. on the Apollo lunar-landing program. In 1971 he joined the Jet Propulsion Laboratory, where he remained until his retirement in 1999. He participated in a number of projects, including Viking, SEASAT, and the Infrared Astronomical Satellite (IRAS). He served as the JPL deputy director of astrophysics, the manager of the Voyager 2 flight engineering office during the spacecraft's encounter with Uranus, and manager of the Mission Profiling and Sequencing Section.

In 1977 he suggested that widely observable celestial events such as nova explosions may be used by hypothetical extraterrestrial intelligences for scheduling the transmission of signals. This would allow receivers in other stellar systems to estimate when the signals would arrive. To test this concept, during a six-month period in 1988, the star Epsilon Eridani was observed using a 40-foot radio telescope at the National Radio Astronomy Observatory in Green Bank, West Virginia, with Nova Cygni 1975 being used as the timer. However, no anomalous radio signals were observed. This does not, of course, preclude the idea from being confirmed at a later date.

He received the NASA Exceptional Service Medal in 1984 for his work on the IRAS and the NASA Outstanding Leadership Medal for his work on the Voyager encounter with Uranus. Asteroid 4838 Billmclaughlin is named after him.
