= Sigma Ceti =

Star system in the constellation Cetus

- Location of σ Ceti (circled in red)

Observation data Epoch J2000.0 Equinox ICRS
- Constellation: Cetus
- σ Cet A
- Right ascension: 02^{h} 32^{m} 05.22884^{s}
- Declination: −15° 14′ 40.8278″
- Apparent magnitude (V): 4.75
- σ Cet B
- Right ascension: 02^{h} 31^{m} 42.47292^{s}
- Declination: −15° 16′ 24.4275″
- Apparent magnitude (V): 8.74

Characteristics

σ Cet A
- Spectral type: F5 V or F4 IV
- U−B color index: −0.03
- B−V color index: +0.45

σ Cet B
- Evolutionary stage: main sequence
- Spectral type: K2.5V

Astrometry

σ Cet A
Radial velocity (R_{v})	−28.85±0.12 km/s
Proper motion (μ)	RA: −80.21 mas/yr Dec.: −146.29 mas/yr
Parallax (π)	37.46±0.25 mas
Distance	87.1 ± 0.6 ly (26.7 ± 0.2 pc)
Absolute magnitude (M_{V})	+2.68

σ Cet B
Proper motion (μ)	RA: −73.371 mas/yr Dec.: −117.842 mas/yr
Parallax (π)	37.1885±0.0188 mas
Distance	87.70 ± 0.04 ly (26.89 ± 0.01 pc)
Absolute magnitude (M_{V})	+6.48

Orbit
Primary	σ Cet Aa
Name	σ Cet Ab
Period (P)	20.68±0.67 years
Semi-major axis (a)	0.3616″±0.0049″ (9.65 AU) (Note: Calculated using the parallax of 0.03746 arcseconds and the separation of 0.3616 arcseconds. 0.3616" / 0.03719" = 9.65 AU.)
Eccentricity (e)	0.854±0.009
Inclination (i)	120.3±1.3°
Longitude of the node (Ω)	23.1±1.3°
Argument of periastron (ω) (primary)	23.4±2.6°
Semi-amplitude (K_{1}) (primary)	7.56±0.25 km/s

Position (relative to σ Cet A)
Component	σ Cet B
Angular distance	345″
Projected separation	9,300 (Note: Calculated using the parallax of 0.03719 arcseconds and the separation of 345 arcseconds. 345" / 0.03719" = 9,300 AU.) AU

Details

σ Cet Aa
Mass	1.45 M_{☉}
Radius	2.108 R_{☉}
Luminosity	6.95 L_{☉}
Surface gravity (log g)	4.07±0.07 cgs
Temperature	6,527±59 K
Metallicity [Fe/H]	−0.12±0.04 dex
Rotational velocity (v sin i)	20 km/s
Age	2.135 Gyr

σ Cet Ab
Mass	0.70 M_{☉}

σ Cet B
Mass	0.77 M_{☉}
Radius	0.698±0.048 R_{☉}
Luminosity	0.262±0.008 L_{☉}
Temperature	4,935±145 K

Other designations
- A: σ Cet, 76 Cet, BD−15°449, FK5 1071, HD 15798, HIP 11783, HR 740, SAO 148445
- B: HIP 11759, HD 15767, BD−15°447, TIC 66574369, SAO 148443

Database references
SIMBAD	σ Cet A
- σ Cet B

Sigma Ceti is a triple star system in the equatorial constellation of Cetus. Its name is a Bayer designation that is Latinized from σ Ceti, and abbreviated Sigma Cet or σ Cet. With an apparent visual magnitude of 4.78, it can be seen with the naked eye on a dark night. Based upon an annual parallax shift of 37.46 mas, it lies at an estimated distance of 87.1 light years from the Sun. It is drifting closer with a line of sight velocity component of −29 km/s.

== Characteristics ==
This is a hierarchical triple system. The inner pair contains the primary member, component Aa, and the secondary, component Ab. They form a spectroscopic and astrometric binary system, but have been resolved with the SOAR telescope. The inner system has an orbital period of 21 years and an eccentric orbit. As of 2025, the most recent periastron (closest distance between stars) was in 2015.

The primary, component Aa, appears to be a normal F-type main sequence star with a stellar classification of F5 V. However, Malaroda (1975) assigned it a classification of F4 IV, which would suggest it is a more evolved subgiant star. It is estimated to have 145% of the Sun's mass and around 211% of the radius of the Sun. With an age of about 2.1 billion years, it is radiating seven times the solar luminosity from its outer atmosphere at an effective temperature of 6,527 K.

The secondary, Sigma Ceti Ab, is 3.89 magnitudes fainter than the primary in the I-band. Little is known about it. Its mass is estimated at 70% the mass of the Sun.

The outer component is the proper motion companion HD 15767, also called Sigma Ceti B. It has a wide separation of 345 arcseconds, or 9,300 AU at its distance. The orbital period is estimated at 500 thousand years. It is a K-dwarf star, with a faint apparent magnitude of 8.74. This star has 77% the mass of the Sun and 70% of the Sun's radius. It radiates 0.26 solar luminosities from its photosphere at an effective temperature of about 5,000 K.

== Name ==
This star, along with π Cet, ε Cet and ρ Cet, was Al Sufi's Al Sadr al Ḳaiṭos, the Whale's Breast.

According to the catalogue of stars in the Technical Memorandum 33-507 - A Reduced Star Catalog Containing 537 Named Stars, Al Sadr al Ḳaiṭos were the title for four stars :ρ Cet as Al Sadr al Ḳaiṭos I, this star (σ Cet) as Al Sadr al Ḳaiṭos II, ε Cet as Al Sadr al Ḳaiṭos III and π Cet as Al Sadr al Ḳaiṭos IV
