= USS Zaurak =

Cargo ship of the United States Navy

History

United States
- Name: Hugh Young; Zaurak
- Namesake: Hugh Frnklin Young; The star Zaurak
- Ordered: as a type (EC2-S-C1) hull, MCE hull 1964, SS Hugh Young
- Builder: Todd Houston Shipbuilding Co., Houston, Texas
- Laid down: 7 October 1943
- Launched: 18 November 1943
- Sponsored by: Miss Betsy Colston Young
- Acquired: 27 November 1943
- Commissioned: 27 November 1943
- Decommissioned: 30 November 1943
- In service: 17 March 1944
- Out of service: 12 March 1946
- Refit: delivered to Todd Johnson Shipyard, New Orleans, LA., for conversion to a Navy cargo ship, 30 November 1943
- Stricken: 26 March 1946
- Identification: Hull symbol:AK-117
- Fate: Sold for scrapping, 14 May 1963, to The Learner Corp./Union Minerals & Alloys Corp., Oakland, CA.

General characteristics
- Class & type: Crater-class cargo ship
- Displacement: 4,023 long tons (4,088 t) (standard); 14,550 long tons (14,780 t) (full load)
- Length: 441 ft 6 in (134.57 m)
- Beam: 56 ft 11 in (17.35 m)
- Draft: 28 ft 4 in (8.64 m)
- Installed power: 2 × Babcock & Wilcox header-type boilers, 220psi 450°; 2,500 shp (1,900 kW)
- Propulsion: 1 × Filer and Stowell triple-expansion reciprocating steam engine; 1 × shaft
- Speed: 12.5 kn (23.2 km/h; 14.4 mph)
- Complement: 206
- Armament: 1 × 5 in (130 mm)/38 caliber dual purpose gun; 4 × 40 mm (1.6 in) 40mm Bofors anti-aircraft gun mounts; 6 × 20 mm (0.79 in) Oerlikon cannons anti-aircraft gun mounts

USS Zaurak (AK-117) was a Crater-class cargo ship commissioned by the U.S. Navy for service in World War II. She was responsible for delivering troops, goods and equipment to locations in the war zone.

== Built in Houston, Texas ==
Zaurak (AK-117) was laid down on 7 October 1943 at Houston, Texas, by the Todd-Houston Shipbuilding Corp. under a Maritime Commission contract (MCE hull 1964) as SS Hugh Young; renamed Zaurak on 13 November 1943; launched on 18 November 1943; sponsored by Miss Betsy Colston Young; delivered to the Navy on 27 November; moved to New Orleans, Louisiana, where she underwent conversion for naval use at the Todd Johnson yard; and commissioned on 17 March 1944.

== World War II Pacific Theatre operations ==
The new cargo ship departed New Orleans on 5 April and arrived in Norfolk, Virginia, on the 13th. After shakedown training in the Chesapeake Bay, she loaded cargo, provisions, and stores at Norfolk and embarked passengers for a voyage to the South Pacific. She stood out of the Chesapeake Bay on 3 May, bound for New York, whence she departed on the 5th.

=== Transiting the Panama Canal ===
After a stop at Guantánamo Bay, Cuba, she transited the Panama Canal on 19 May and headed independently toward Espiritu Santo in the New Hebrides islands. Almost a month later, on 14 June, she steamed into Segond Channel. The ship disembarked passengers immediately but remained at Espiritu Santo for three weeks, during which time American forces invaded the Mariana Islands.

=== Supporting the Saipan invasion forces ===
On 2 July, Zaurak departed Espiritu Santo to steam via Nouméa, New Caledonia, to Eniwetok and thence to join in the Marianas campaign. She arrived at Eniwetok on the 18th and departed there three days later with a convoy bound for Saipan. She arrived in the anchorage between Saipan and Tinian on 25 July and remained there for 17 days. On 9 August, she embarked 812 battle-weary officers and men of the Army's 27th Infantry Division and, two days later, departed the Marianas bound, via Eniwetok, for Espiritu Santo. The cargo ship arrived back in Segond Channel on 24 August and disembarked her passengers.

=== Supporting the invasion of the Philippines ===
For the next two months, Zaurak made a series of voyages between various islands in the Southwestern Pacific, visiting several of the Solomon Islands, New Guinea, Emirau, Manus, and New Caledonia. On 23 October, she departed Bougainville in the Solomons with a convoy of 31 ships bound for the Philippines with reinforcements and supplies for the forces that had just invaded Leyte. She steamed into Leyte Gulf at the head of the convoy on 29 October and anchored in San Pedro Bay.

=== Under attack by Japanese aircraft ===
During her 11 days there, Zaurak received her baptism of fire. Initially, conditions in the San Pedro Bay anchorage were quiet enough; but, when she moved to the San Juanico Strait anchorage on the 31st, enemy air activity—occasioned by the proximity of Tacloban airfield—rose markedly. On 1 and 2 November, she fired her first shots at enemy planes attacking the airstrip ashore but, due to darkness and extreme range, scored no hits. On the 3d and 4th, Japanese began attacking the ships in the anchorage as secondary targets.

=== Zaurak shoots down attacking plane ===
The ship claimed her first enemy plane on the latter morning when a plane attacking the airfield veered out of a searchlight beam and away from shore-based anti-aircraft fire to attack the ships in the anchorage. Zaurak's secondary battery opened fire, but the plane flew right through her field of fire to crash into SS Matthew P. Deady in the vicinity of that merchant ship's number 1 hatch. Almost immediately, volunteers from Zaurak went to the stricken merchantman's aid, rescuing over 20 men from the water around the blazing ship. A little later that same morning, another Japanese plane ran afoul of Zaurak's guns and fell in flames into the water. Soon thereafter, two more intruders approached the ship but never came close enough to become a good target. Though she claimed hits on both, neither plane went down.

=== Departing the Philippine area ===
During her final five days at Leyte, she experienced several more air attacks, but her guns downed no more planes. On 8 November, the ship had to get underway to ride out a heavy tropical storm which approached in typhoon force. The following day, Zaurak embarked passengers and departed Leyte Gulf in a convoy of 20 ships, bound for Hollandia, New Guinea.

=== Delivering troops to the attack on Iwo Jima ===
After three months of voyages between such places as Guadalcanal, Espiritu Santo, New Caledonia, Bougainville, Green Island, Oro Bay, and Finschhafen, she voyaged to Munda in March 1945 to embark reinforcements for the Iwo Jima operation then in progress. She delivered elements of the 147th Infantry to Iwo Jima on 29 March and remained there for a week, embarking units of the 3rd Marine Division on the 27th.

=== Transporting U.S. Marines to Guam and Okinawa ===
Two days later, she sailed from the Marshalls and, on 1 April, arrived at Guam where the marines disembarked. From there, she headed for Pavuvu in the Solomons, where she embarked Marine Corps and Navy men for passage back to Hawaii. Upon her arrival in Pearl Harbor on 3 May, she learned that most of the marines embarked were needed at Okinawa. She therefore departed Oahu on 6 May and set a course via Eniwetok and Ulithi for the Ryūkyūs. She arrived off Okinawa on 13 June and remained there for six days disembarking troops and unloading cargo. On 19 June, she got underway for Ulithi, on the first leg of the voyage back to the United States. After additional stops at Eniwetok, Kwajalein, and Pearl Harbor, she arrived in Seattle, Washington, on 10 August. Three days later, she entered the Todd Shipyard for her first major overhaul.

=== End-of-war activity ===
While she was in the yard, Japan capitulated. Zaurak's repairs were completed in mid-September; and, after embarking passengers, the ship departed Seattle on 21 September. Steaming via Pearl Harbor and Ulithi, she arrived in Buckner Bay, Okinawa, on 25 October. From there, she moved to Shanghai, China, where she traded replacement troops for men returning home to the United States. From there, she proceeded to Jinsen, Korea, to make a similar personnel trade. Following that, the ship made a stop at Taku in North China and a return visit to Shanghai before getting underway on 1 December to return home. Following a non-stop voyage across the expanse of the Pacific, Zaurak entered San Francisco Bay on 20 December.

== Post-war decommissioning ==
She remained at San Francisco until decommissioned on 12 March 1946. She was transferred to the Maritime Commission that same day for layup at Suisun Bay, California, with the National Defense Reserve Fleet. Her name was struck from the Navy List on 28 March 1946.

== Military awards and honors ==
Zaurak earned one battle star for service in World War II. Her crew was eligible for the following medals and ribbons:

- China Service Medal (extended)
- American Campaign Medal
- Asiatic-Pacific Campaign Medal (1)
- World War II Victory Medal
- Navy Occupation Service Medal (with Asia clasp)
- Philippines Liberation Medal

Crew member individual awards:

- Combat Action Ribbon (retroactive)
