= 37 Tauri =

Star in the constellation Taurus

- Location of 37 Tauri (circled in red)

Observation data Epoch J2000 Equinox ICRS
- Constellation: Taurus
- Right ascension: 04^{h} 04^{m} 41.71484^{s}
- Declination: +22° 04′ 54.9243″
- Apparent magnitude (V): 4.36

Characteristics
- Spectral type: K0 III-IIIb
- U−B color index: 0.95
- B−V color index: 1.07
- R−I color index: 0.53

Astrometry
Radial velocity (R_{v})	+9.52±0.11 km/s
Proper motion (μ)	RA: +90.53 mas/yr Dec.: −59.47 mas/yr
Parallax (π)	17.43±0.21 mas
Distance	187 ± 2 ly (57.4 ± 0.7 pc)
Absolute magnitude (M_{V})	0.57

Details
Mass	1.99 M_{☉}
Radius	10.15±0.69 R_{☉}
Luminosity	60±6 L_{☉}
Surface gravity (log g)	2.77 cgs
Temperature	4,732±26 K
Metallicity [Fe/H]	+0.01 dex
Rotational velocity (v sin i)	2.8 km/s
Age	1.39 Gyr

Other designations
- 37 Tau, BD+21°585, FK5 1112, HD 25604, HIP 19038, HR 1256, SAO 76430, WDS J04047+2205A

Database references
SIMBAD	data

37 Tauri is a single, orange-hued star in the zodiac constellation of Taurus. It can be seen with the naked eye, having an apparent visual magnitude of 4.36. A magnitude 10.01 visual companion has an angular separation of 134.30″ on a position angle of 138.6°, as of 2003. Based on an annual parallax shift of 17.43±0.21 mas, 37 Tauri is about 187 light years away. It is moving further from the Sun with a heliocentric radial velocity of 9.5 km/s.

This is an evolved K-type giant star with a stellar classification of K0 III-IIIb. At the age of 1.39 billion years, it has become a red clump giant, indicating that it is generating energy through helium fusion at its core. The star has around double the mass of the Sun and has expanded to 10 times the Sun's radius. It is radiating roughly 60 times the Sun's luminosity from its enlarged photosphere at an effective temperature of 4,732 K.

== Chinese astronomy ==
In Chinese astronomy, 37 Tauri is called 月, Pinyin: Yuè, meaning Moon, because this star is marking itself and stand alone in Moon asterism, Hairy Head mansion (see: Chinese constellation).
