= Rho1 Eridani =

K-type giant star in the constellation Eridanus

ρ^{1} Eridani
Observation data Epoch J2000.0 Equinox ICRS
- Constellation: Eridanus
- Right ascension: 03^{h} 01^{m} 10.02608^{s}
- Declination: −07° 39′ 46.8232″
- Apparent magnitude (V): 5.75

Characteristics
- Spectral type: K0 III
- U−B color index: +0.86
- B−V color index: +1.04

Astrometry
Radial velocity (R_{v})	13.68±0.33 km/s
Proper motion (μ)	RA: +101.02 mas/yr Dec.: −69.97 mas/yr
Parallax (π)	10.07±0.51 mas
Distance	320 ± 20 ly (99 ± 5 pc)
Absolute magnitude (M_{V})	0.899

Details
Mass	2.05 M_{☉}
Radius	10 R_{☉}
Luminosity	46.9 L_{☉}
Surface gravity (log g)	2.7 cgs
Temperature	4,710 K
Metallicity [Fe/H]	0.09 dex
Rotational velocity (v sin i)	2.4 km/s

Other designations
- ρ^{1} Eridani, ρ^{1} Eri, 8 Eridani, BD−08°562, HD 18784, HIP 14060, HR 907, SAO 130243

Database references
SIMBAD	data

Rho^{1} Eridani (Rho^{1} Eri, ρ^{1} Eri), is a star located in the constellation Eridanus. It forms an asterism with the stars Rho^{2} and Rho^{3} Eridani, south of Cetus, in the upper north east portion of Eridanus. The star has an apparent visual magnitude of 5.75, which indicates it is faintly visible to the naked eye on a clear, dark night. Based upon parallax measurements made with the Hipparcos satellite, this star is roughly 320 light years away from the Sun. Judging from changes to its proper motion, there is a chance that this is an astrometric binary.

This is an evolved K-type giant star with a stellar classification of K0 III. It is a red clump giant on the horizontal branch of the Hertzsprung–Russell diagram, indicating that is it now generating energy through the thermonuclear fusion of helium at its core. The star has more than twice the mass of the Sun and has expanded to 10 times the Sun's radius. As such, it is radiating nearly 47 times the solar luminosity from its outer atmosphere at an effective temperature of 4,710 K.
