= Rho2 Eridani =

K-type giant star in the constellation Eridanus

ρ^{2} Eridani
Observation data Epoch J2000.0 Equinox ICRS
- Constellation: Eridanus
- Right ascension: 03^{h} 02^{m} 42.28856^{s}
- Declination: −07° 41′ 07.7165″
- Apparent magnitude (V): 5.32

Characteristics
- Spectral type: K0 III
- U−B color index: +0.73
- B−V color index: +0.94

Astrometry
Radial velocity (R_{v})	26.38±0.23 km/s
Proper motion (μ)	RA: +49.30 mas/yr Dec.: −5.42 mas/yr
Parallax (π)	12.32±1.23 mas
Distance	260 ± 30 ly (81 ± 8 pc)
Absolute magnitude (M_{V})	0.830

Details
Mass	2.53 M_{☉}
Radius	9 R_{☉}
Luminosity	45.7 L_{☉}
Surface gravity (log g)	2.6 cgs
Temperature	4,864 K
Metallicity [Fe/H]	0.19 dex
Rotational velocity (v sin i)	0.0 km/s

Other designations
- ρ^{2} Eridani, ρ^{2} Eri, 9 Eridani, BD−08°568, HD 18953, HIP 14168, HR 917, SAO 130254

Database references
SIMBAD	data

Rho^{2} Eridani is a star located in the constellation Eridanus. It forms an asterism with Rho^{1} and Rho^{3} Eridani, south of Cetus, in the upper north east portion of Eridanus. The star has an apparent visual magnitude of 5.32, which indicates it is visible to the naked eye on a clear, dark night. Based upon parallax measurements made with the Hipparcos satellite, this star is roughly 260 light years away from the Sun.

This is an evolved K-type giant star with a stellar classification of K0 III. It is a red clump giant on the horizontal branch of the Hertzsprung–Russell diagram, indicating that is it now generating energy through the thermonuclear fusion of helium at its core. The star has 2.5 times the mass of the Sun and has expanded to 9 times the Sun's radius. As such, it is radiating nearly 46 times the solar luminosity from its outer atmosphere at an effective temperature of 4,864 K.

There is a magnitude 9.7 companion star at an angular separation of 1.8″. Most likely the pair form a binary star system. At least one of the stars appears to be a source of X-ray emission. The X-ray band flux is 3.65×10^{−15} W·m^{−2}.
