= Rho3 Eridani =

Star in the constellation Eridanus

ρ^{3} Eridani
Observation data Epoch J2000.0 Equinox ICRS
- Constellation: Eridanus
- Right ascension: 03^{h} 04^{m} 16.51707^{s}
- Declination: −07° 36′ 03.0859″
- Apparent magnitude (V): 5.26

Characteristics
- Evolutionary stage: main sequence
- Spectral type: A5 V
- U−B color index: +0.07
- B−V color index: +0.21

Astrometry
Radial velocity (R_{v})	15.0±4.2 km/s
Proper motion (μ)	RA: +67.56 mas/yr Dec.: +17.43 mas/yr
Parallax (π)	24.06±0.40 mas
Distance	136 ± 2 ly (41.6 ± 0.7 pc)
Absolute magnitude (M_{V})	+2.17

Details
Mass	1.83 M_{☉}
Radius	1.2 R_{☉}
Luminosity	10 L_{☉}
Temperature	7,400 K
Rotational velocity (v sin i)	186 km/s
Age	500 Myr

Other designations
- ρ^{3} Eridani, ρ^{3} Eri, 10 Eridani, BD−08°572, HD 19107, HIP 14293, HR 925, SAO 130269

Database references
SIMBAD	data

Rho^{3} Eridani, Latinized from ρ^{3} Eridani, is a star located in the constellation Eridanus. It forms an asterism with Rho^{1} and Rho^{2} Eridani, south of Cetus, in the upper north east portion of Eridanus. The star has an apparent visual magnitude of 5.26, which is bright enough to be seen with the naked eye on a dark, clear night. The distance to this star, as determined via the parallax method, is about 136 light years.

This is an A-type main sequence star with a stellar classification of A5 V. (Some sources list it as A8 V.) It is some 500 million years old and is spinning rapidly with a projected rotational velocity of 186 km/s. This rotation is giving the star a slightly oblate shape, with the equator being 5% larger than the poles. The star has about 120% of the radius of the Sun, and 183% of the Sun's mass. It shines with 10 times the solar luminosity from its outer atmosphere at an effective temperature of 7,400 K.
