= 77 Ceti =

Star in the constellation Cetus

Observation data Epoch J2000 Equinox ICRS
- Constellation: Cetus
- Right ascension: 02^{h} 34^{m} 42.62364^{s}
- Declination: −07° 51′ 34.0026″
- Apparent magnitude (V): 5.731

Characteristics
- Evolutionary stage: red giant branch
- Spectral type: K2 III
- U−B color index: +1.68
- B−V color index: +1.393±0.008

Astrometry
Radial velocity (R_{v})	24.9±2 km/s
Proper motion (μ)	RA: +59.658 mas/yr Dec.: −63.960 mas/yr
Parallax (π)	6.5487±0.0618 mas
Distance	498 ± 5 ly (153 ± 1 pc)
Absolute magnitude (M_{V})	+0.01

Details
Mass	3.5 M_{☉}
Radius	28 R_{☉}
Luminosity	239 L_{☉}
Surface gravity (log g)	1.99 cgs
Temperature	4,478 K
Metallicity [Fe/H]	−0.12 dex
Age	250 Myr

Other designations
- BD−08°484, HD 16074, HIP 12002, HR 752, SAO 129984

Database references
SIMBAD	data

77 Ceti is a single, orange-hued star located 498 light years away in the equatorial constellation of Cetus. It is faintly visible to the naked eye, having an apparent visual magnitude of 5.7. This is an evolved giant star with a stellar classification of K2 III. It is radiating 239 times the Sun's luminosity from its photosphere at an effective temperature of 4,478 K.
