= Zeta Eridani =

Binary star system in the constellation Eridanus

ζ Eridani
- Location of ζ Eridani (circled in red)

Observation data Epoch J2000.0 Equinox ICRS
- Constellation: Eridanus
- Right ascension: 03^{h} 15^{m} 50.02656^{s}
- Declination: −08° 49′ 11.0220″
- Apparent magnitude (V): 4.80

Characteristics
- Spectral type: kA4hA9mA9V
- U−B color index: +0.07
- B−V color index: +0.24

Astrometry
Radial velocity (R_{v})	−5.8±4.2 km/s
Proper motion (μ)	RA: −0.35 mas/yr Dec.: +46.10 mas/yr
Parallax (π)	29.72±0.29 mas
Distance	110 ± 1 ly (33.6 ± 0.3 pc)
Absolute magnitude (M_{V})	1.97

Orbit
Period (P)	17.9297±0.0039 d
Eccentricity (e)	0.14±0.03
Periastron epoch (T)	43,051.07±0.83 JD
Argument of periastron (ω) (secondary)	122±11°
Semi-amplitude (K_{1}) (primary)	21.5±0.6 km/s

Details
Mass	1.85 M_{☉}
Radius	1.97 R_{☉}
Luminosity	10.3 L_{☉}
Surface gravity (log g)	4.05 cgs
Temperature	7,575 K
Metallicity [Fe/H]	0.04 dex
Rotational velocity (v sin i)	82 km/s
Age	800 Myr

Other designations
- Zibal, ζ Eri, 13 Eri, FK5 1091, HD 20320, HIP 15197, HR 984, SAO 130387, BD−09°624, WDS J03158-0849A

Database references
SIMBAD	data

Zeta Eridani (ζ Eridani, abbreviated Zeta Eri, ζ Eri) is a binary star in the constellation of Eridanus. With an apparent visual magnitude of 4.80, it is visible to the naked eye on a clear dark night. Based on parallax measurements taken during the Hipparcos mission, it is approximately 110 light-years from the Sun.

Zeta Eridani is the primary or 'A' component of a multiple star system designated WDS J03158-0849 (the secondary or 'B' component is 14 Eridani). Zeta Eridani's two components are therefore designated WDS J03158-0849 Aa and Ab. Zeta Eridani Aa is formally named Zibal /ˈzaɪbəl/, the traditional name for the system.

== Nomenclature ==
ζ Eridani (Latinised to Zeta Eridani) is the binary star's Bayer designation. WDS J03158-0849 is its designation in the Washington Double Star Catalog. The designations of the two components as WDS J03158-0849 Aa and Ab derive from the convention used by the Washington Multiplicity Catalog (WMC) for multiple star systems, and adopted by the International Astronomical Union (IAU).

Zeta Eridani bore the traditional name of Zibal. This is an old misreading of the Arabic رئل riʼal "ostrich chicks" (with the carrier letter for the glottal stop taken for a 'b', and ر 'r' taken for ز 'z'), originally applied to a number of stars near Beid and Keid.

In 2016, the International Astronomical Union organized a Working Group on Star Names (WGSN) to catalogue and standardize proper names for stars. The WGSN decided to attribute proper names to individual stars rather than entire multiple systems. It approved the name Zibal for the component Zeta Eridani Aa on 12 September 2016 and it is now so included in the List of IAU-approved Star Names.

== Properties ==
Zeta Eridani is a single-lined spectroscopic binary system with an orbital period of 17.9 days and an eccentricity of 0.14. The primary is a mild Am star with a stellar classification of kA4hA9mA9V. This notation indicates this is a main-sequence star with the Ca-II K absorption line strength (k) of an A4 star, and the hydrogen lines (h) and metallic lines (m) of an A9 star. It has about 185% of the Sun's mass and 1.97 times the Sun's radius. This is a relatively young star with an estimated age of 800 million years, and it appears to have a moderately high rotation rate with a projected rotational velocity of 82 km/s.

The system displays a statistically significant infrared excess at a wavelength of 70 μm. This suggests the presence of an orbiting debris disk. The temperature of the dust is 70 K, indicating an orbital distance of 31 AU. It has an estimated mass of about 0.26% of the Earth.
