= Pi Eridani =

Red giant star in the constellation Eridanus

π Eridani
- Location of π Eridani (circled in red)

Observation data Epoch J2000.0 Equinox ICRS
- Constellation: Eridanus
- Right ascension: 03^{h} 46^{m} 08.53581^{s}
- Declination: −12° 06′ 05.7282″
- Apparent magnitude (V): 4.40 (4.38 - 4.44)

Characteristics
- Evolutionary stage: asymptotic giant branch
- Spectral type: M1 III
- U−B color index: +1.96
- B−V color index: +1.61
- Variable type: Lb?

Astrometry
Radial velocity (R_{v})	45.2±0.1 km/s
Proper motion (μ)	RA: +55.98 mas/yr Dec.: +59.28 mas/yr
Parallax (π)	6.78±0.53 mas
Distance	480 ± 40 ly (150 ± 10 pc)
Absolute magnitude (M_{V})	−1.40

Details
Radius	77 R_{☉}
Luminosity	1,123 L_{☉}
Temperature	3,841 K

Other designations
- π Eridani, π Eri, 26 Eridani, BD−12°707, HD 23614, HIP 17593, HR 1162, SAO 149158

Database references
SIMBAD	data

Pi Eridani, Latinized from π Eridani, is a star in the constellation Eridanus. It has an apparent visual magnitude of 4.40, which is bright enough to be seen on a dark, clear night. Based upon parallax measurements, it is located roughly 480 light years from the Sun.

This is an evolved red giant star with a stellar classification of M1 III, and is currently on the asymptotic giant branch. It is a slow irregular variable type LB that can increase in magnitude up to 4.38. The measured angular diameter of this star is 4.8±0.5 mas. At the estimated distance of Pi Eridani, this yields a physical size of about 77 times the radius of the Sun. It shines with 1,123 times the luminosity of the Sun from an outer atmosphere at an effective temperature of 3,841 K.
