= Tau4 Eridani =

Binary star system in the constellation Eridanus

τ^{4} Eridani
- Location of τ4 Eridani (circled)

Observation data Epoch ICRS Equinox ICRS
- Constellation: Eridanus
- τ^{4} Eridani A
- Right ascension: 03^{h} 19^{m} 31.0006^{s}
- Declination: −21° 45′ 28.315″
- Apparent magnitude (V): 3.57−3.72
- τ^{4} Eridani B
- Right ascension: 03^{h} 19^{m} 30.6092^{s}
- Declination: −21° 45′ 26.348″
- Apparent magnitude (V): 9.5

Characteristics

τ^{4} Eridani A
- Evolutionary stage: asymptotic giant branch
- Spectral type: M3/4 III
- U−B color index: +1.79
- B−V color index: +1.61
- Variable type: Lb

Astrometry

τ^{4} Eridani A
Radial velocity (R_{v})	+41.7±0.7 km/s
Proper motion (μ)	RA: +52.774 mas/yr Dec.: +32.718 mas/yr
Parallax (π)	10.6153±0.3213 mas
Distance	307 ± 9 ly (94 ± 3 pc)
Absolute magnitude (M_{V})	−0.79

τ^{4} Eridani B
Proper motion (μ)	RA: +52.919 mas/yr Dec.: +34.104 mas/yr
Parallax (π)	10.6682±0.1066 mas
Distance	306 ± 3 ly (93.7 ± 0.9 pc)

Position (relative to A)
Component	B
Angular distance	5.7″
Position angle	291°
Projected separation	5,800 AU

Details

τ^{4} Eridani A
Mass	1.73±0.3 M_{☉}
Radius	103 R_{☉}
Luminosity	1,537 L_{☉}
Surface gravity (log g)	0.91 cgs
Temperature	3,652 K

τ^{4} Eridani B
Mass	0.9 M_{☉}

Other designations
- τ^{4} Eridani, τ^{4} Eri, 16 Eridani, BD−22°584, HD 20720, HIP 15474, HR 1003, SAO 168460

Database references

τ^{4} Eridani A
SIMBAD	data

τ^{4} Eridani B
SIMBAD	data

Tau^{4} Eridani (τ^{4} Eridani, τ^{4} Eri) is a binary star system in the constellation Eridanus. It is visible to the naked eye with an apparent visual magnitude that varies from 3.57 to 3.72. The distance to this star can be estimated using the parallax method, which yields a value of roughly 300 light years.

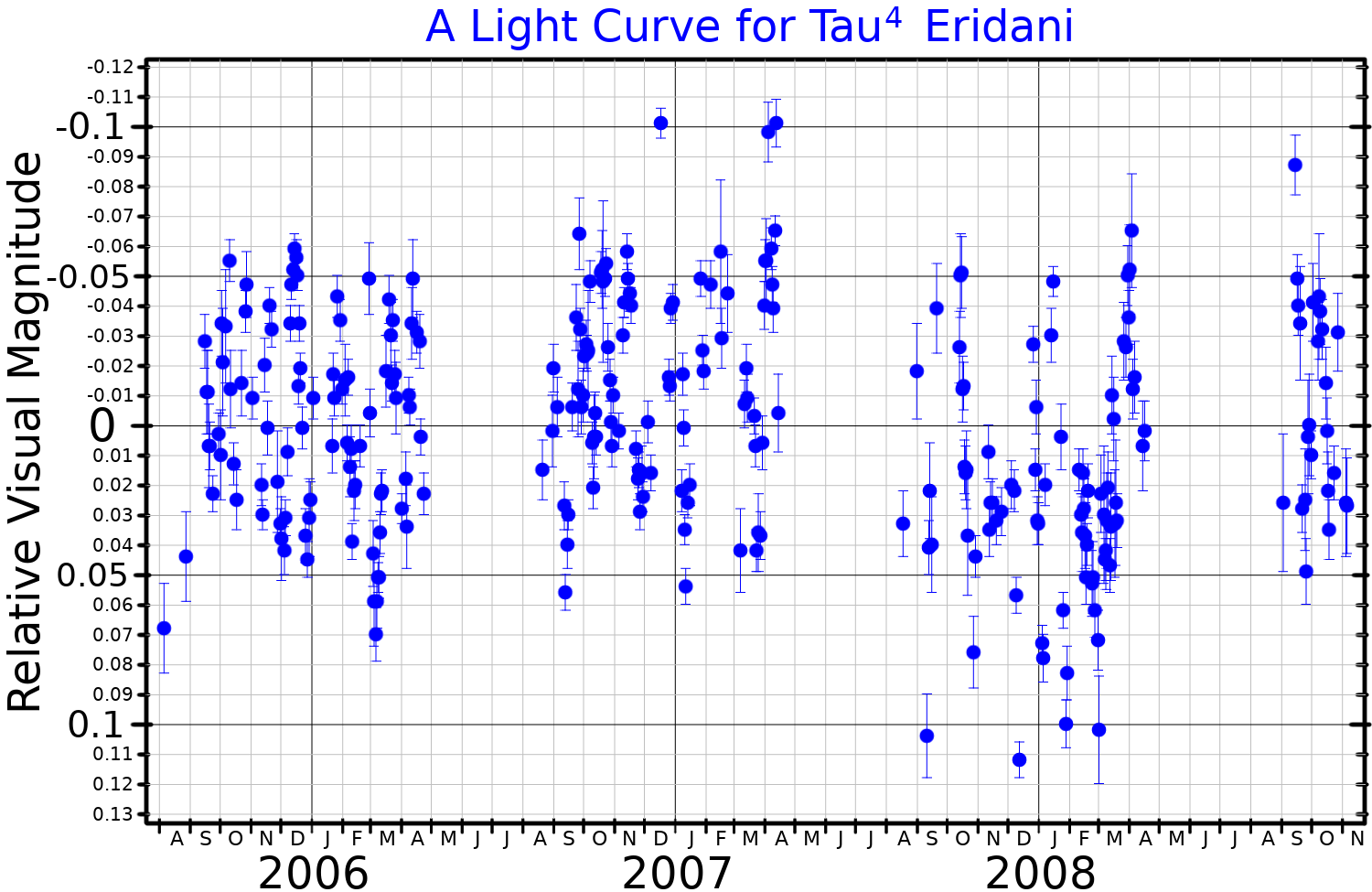
A visual band light curve for Tau^{4} Eridani, plotted from data published by Tabur et al. (2009)

The primary components ia an evolved red giant star currently on the asymptotic giant branch with a stellar classification of M3/4 III. It is a slow irregular variable star of type Lb, undergoing changes in magnitude over the range 3.57−3.72 with a periodicity of 23.8 d. This star has 1.73 times the mass of the Sun and 103 times the radius of the Sun. It shines with 1,537 times the luminosity of the Sun from its photosphere at an effective temperature of 3,650 K.

The secondary is a magnitude 9.5 star at an angular separation of 5.7″ along a position angle of 291°, as of 2013. This angular separation implies a projected separation of 5,800 astronomical units.
