= Tau3 Eridani =

A-type star in the constellation Eridanus

τ^{3} Eridani
- Location of τ^{3} Eridani (circled in red)

Observation data Epoch J2000.0 Equinox ICRS
- Constellation: Eridanus
- Right ascension: 03^{h} 02^{m} 23.49939^{s}
- Declination: −23° 37′ 28.0936″
- Apparent magnitude (V): 4.10

Characteristics
- Evolutionary stage: main sequence
- Spectral type: A3 IV-V
- U−B color index: +0.08
- B−V color index: +0.16

Astrometry
Radial velocity (R_{v})	−9.8 km/s
Proper motion (μ)	RA: −147.25 mas/yr Dec.: −55.28 mas/yr
Parallax (π)	36.80±0.18 mas
Distance	88.6 ± 0.4 ly (27.2 ± 0.1 pc)
Absolute magnitude (M_{V})	+1.91

Details
Mass	1.78 M_{☉}
Radius	1.9 R_{☉}
Luminosity	13.7 L_{☉}
Surface gravity (log g)	4.17 cgs
Temperature	8,251±281 K
Metallicity [Fe/H]	−0.21 dex
Rotational velocity (v sin i)	133 km/s
Age	476 Myr

Other designations
- τ^{3} Eri, 11 Eri, CD−24 1387, CPD−24 358, GJ 121, HD 18978, HIP 14146, HR 919, SAO 168249

Database references
SIMBAD	data

Tau^{3} Eridani, Latinized from τ^{3} Eridani, is a star in the constellation Eridanus. It is visible to the naked eye with an apparent visual magnitude of 4.10. Using the parallax method, the distance to this star can be estimated as 88.6 light years. In 2001 it was reported as a candidate Vega-like star, meaning it appears to radiate an infrared excess from an orbiting circumstellar disk. However, this has not been confirmed.

This is an A-type star with a stellar classification of A3 IV-V. The luminosity class of IV-V indicates the spectrum displays traits intermediate between a main sequence and subgiant star. It is around 476 million years old and is spinning rapidly with a projected rotational velocity of 133 km/s. This is creating an equatorial bulge that might be 7% wider than the polar radius. Tau^{3} Eridani has 178% of the Sun's mass and nearly double the radius of the Sun. The star shines with 13.7 times the solar luminosity from an outer atmosphere at an effective temperature of 8,251 K.
