= Tau5 Eridani =

Star in the constellation Eridanus

τ^{5} Eridani
- Location of τ^{5} Eridani (circled)

Observation data Epoch J2000.0 Equinox ICRS
- Constellation: Eridanus
- Right ascension: 03^{h} 33^{m} 47.27613^{s}
- Declination: −21° 37′ 58.3830″
- Apparent magnitude (V): 4.26

Characteristics
- Spectral type: B0 V + B9 V
- U−B color index: 0.35
- B−V color index: −0.09

Astrometry
Proper motion (μ)	RA: +44.94 mas/yr Dec.: −28.16 mas/yr
Parallax (π)	11.12±0.21 mas
Distance	293 ± 6 ly (90 ± 2 pc)
Absolute magnitude (M_{V})	−0.51

Orbit
Period (P)	6.2236 d
Eccentricity (e)	0.2
Periastron epoch (T)	2424446.548 JD
Argument of periastron (ω) (secondary)	313°
Semi-amplitude (K_{1}) (primary)	107 km/s
Semi-amplitude (K_{2}) (secondary)	103 km/s

Details

τ^{5} Eri A
Mass	3.30+0.24 −0.20 M_{☉}
Radius	3.2 R_{☉}
Luminosity	188 L_{☉}
Surface gravity (log g)	4.00±0.15 cgs
Temperature	12,514±425 K
Rotational velocity (v sin i)	55±8 km/s
Age	157+23 −45 Myr

τ^{5} Eri B
Radius	2.6 R_{☉}
Rotational velocity (v sin i)	50±8 km/s

Other designations
- τ^{5} Eridani, τ^{5} Eri, 19 Eridani, BD−22°628, HD 22203, HIP 16611, HR 1088, SAO 168634

Database references
SIMBAD	data

Tau^{5} Eridani, Latinized from τ^{5} Eridani, is a binary star system in the constellation Eridanus. It is visible to the naked eye with a combined apparent visual magnitude of 4.26. The distance to this system, as estimated using the parallax technique, is around 293 light years.

Tau^{5} Eridani is a double-lined spectroscopic binary system. The two stars orbit each other closely with a period of 6.2 days and an eccentricity of 0.2. On average, the two stars are separated by around 0.183 AU.

The primary component is a B-type main sequence star with a stellar classification of B0 V. It is around 157 million years old and is spinning with a projected rotational velocity of 55 km/s. The star has around 3.3 times the mass of the Sun and 3.2 times the Sun's radius. It radiates 188 times the solar luminosity from an outer atmosphere at an effective temperature of 12,514 K.

The secondary component has a stellar classification of B9 V. It is slightly smaller, with an estimated size equal to 2.6 times the radius of the Sun.

Although τ^{5} Eridani has no bright visual companion stars, the galaxy IC 1953 is less than 10' away. It is one of the brighter members of a loose group of galaxies called the Eridanus Group scattered around the components of τ Eridani.
