= Tau1 Eridani =

Binary star system in the constellation Eridanus

τ^{1} Eridani
- Location of τ^{1} Eridani (circled in red)

Observation data Epoch J2000 Equinox ICRS
- Constellation: Eridanus
- Right ascension: 02^{h} 45^{m} 06.18710^{s}
- Declination: −18° 34′ 21.2149″
- Apparent magnitude (V): 4.46

Characteristics
- Evolutionary stage: main sequence
- Spectral type: F7V
- U−B color index: +0.00
- B−V color index: +0.48

Astrometry
Radial velocity (R_{v})	+25.9 km/s
Proper motion (μ)	RA: +334.20 mas/yr Dec.: +37.19 mas/yr
Parallax (π)	70.32±1.83 mas
Distance	46 ± 1 ly (14.2 ± 0.4 pc)
Absolute magnitude (M_{V})	+3.68

Orbit
Period (P)	958 d
Semi-major axis (a)	2.1 AU
Eccentricity (e)	0.45
Periastron epoch (T)	39391.9
Argument of periastron (ω) (secondary)	180°

Details

τ^{1} Eridani A
Mass	1.15 M_{☉}
Radius	1.325 R_{☉}
Luminosity	2.572 L_{☉}
Surface gravity (log g)	4.34 cgs
Temperature	6,357 K
Metallicity [Fe/H]	−0.08 ± 0.06 dex
Rotation	3.847 d
Rotational velocity (v sin i)	28.02 km/s

τ^{1} Eridani B
Mass	0.15 – 0.30 M_{☉}

Other designations
- 1 Eri, BD−19°518, FK5 2075, GJ 111, HD 17206, HIP 12843, HR 818, SAO 11557

Database references
SIMBAD	data

Tau^{1} Eridani, Latinized from τ^{1} Eridani, is a binary star system in the constellation Eridanus. It has an apparent magnitude of 4.46, making it visible to the naked eye in suitably dark conditions. This is a spectroscopic binary with an orbital period of 958 days. It is located about 46 light years from the Earth. At present, the system is moving away from the Sun with a radial velocity of +26 km/s. About 305,000 years ago, perihelion passage was made at an estimated distance of 30.5 ly (9.35 pc).

Tau^{1} Eridani was a latter designation of 90 Ceti.

== Debris disk ==
A moderate far-infrared excess was observed for this star system, in the 12μm, 25μm, 60μm and 100μm wavelengths, by the Infrared Astronomical Satellite (IRAS), and published in 1993. This discovery was subsequently interpreted as indicating a debris disk with a radius near 500 AU. It was further speculated that, if the star system had been observed at longer wavelengths, it was likely the debris disk would have been seen to have a radius considerably wider than 500 AU.

Later observations made by the Spitzer Space Telescope, published in 2004, detected no substantial infrared excess around the stars, within the 14-35μm range of wavelengths.
