= Tau8 Eridani =

Variable star in the constellation Eridanus

τ^{8} Eridani
- Location of τ^{8} Eridani (circled in red)

Observation data Epoch J2000.0 Equinox ICRS
- Constellation: Eridanus
- Right ascension: 03^{h} 53^{m} 42.70302^{s}
- Declination: −24° 36′ 44.0309″
- Apparent magnitude (V): 4.63 - 4.65

Characteristics
- Evolutionary stage: main sequence
- Spectral type: B6 V
- U−B color index: −0.48
- B−V color index: −0.13
- Variable type: SPB

Astrometry
Radial velocity (R_{v})	+23 km/s
Proper motion (μ)	RA: +31.28 mas/yr Dec.: −7.49 mas/yr
Parallax (π)	8.65±0.30 mas
Distance	380 ± 10 ly (116 ± 4 pc)
Absolute magnitude (M_{V})	−0.67

Orbit
Period (P)	454.0±0.1 d
Eccentricity (e)	0.21±0.01
Periastron epoch (T)	2450497±3 JD
Argument of periastron (ω) (secondary)	106±3°
Semi-amplitude (K_{1}) (primary)	22.3±0.3 km/s

Details

τ^{8} Eri A
Mass	5.0±0.1 M_{☉}
Radius	3.81 (Note: Derived from known luminosity and surface temperature of star.) R_{☉}
Luminosity	256 L_{☉}
Surface gravity (log g)	4.00 cgs
Temperature	11,858 K
Rotational velocity (v sin i)	30 km/s
Age	32.8±9.9 Myr

Other designations
- τ^{8} Eridani, τ^{8} Eri, 33 Eridani, CD−24°1945, HD 24587, HIP 18216, HR 1213, SAO 168925

Database references
SIMBAD	data

Tau^{8} Eridani, Latinized from τ^{8} Eridani, is a binary star system in the constellation Eridanus. It is visible to the naked eye with a combined apparent visual magnitude of 4.65. The distance to this system can be estimated via the parallax method, yielding a value of around 380 light years.

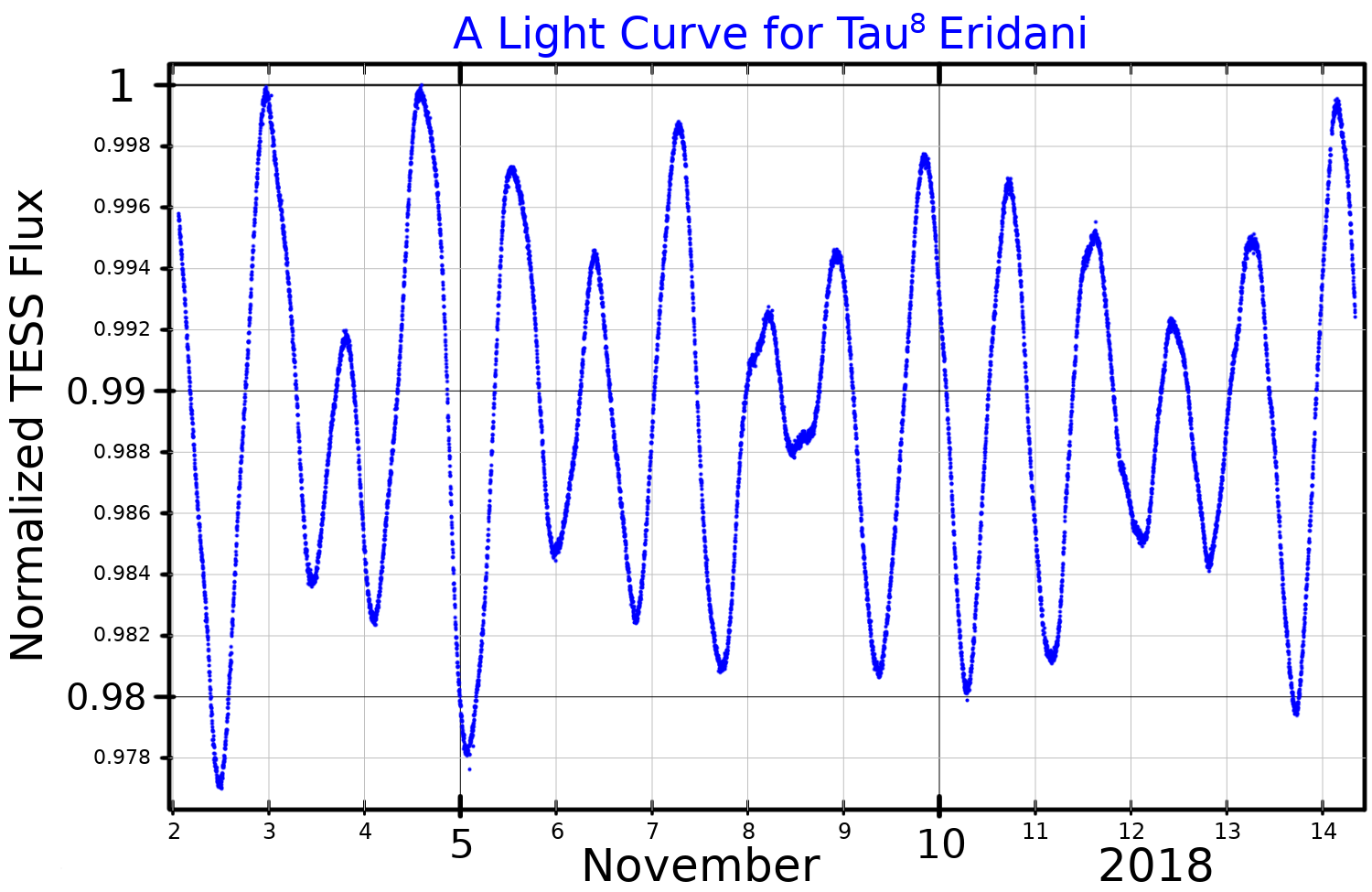
A light curve for Tau^{8} Eridani, plotted from TESS data

This is a single-lined spectroscopic binary star system with an orbital period of about 454 days and an eccentricity of 0.21. The primary component is a B-type main sequence star with a stellar classification of B6 V. Gautier Mathys et al. announced that the star is variable, in 1986. It is a slowly pulsating B-type star that undergoes radial-velocity variation with a frequency of 1.1569 times per day. The star has about five times the mass of the Sun and shines with 256 times the Sun's luminosity. The outer atmosphere has an effective temperature of 11,858 K and may possess a longitudinal magnetic field with a strength of −140±71 G.
