= Tau9 Eridani =

Binary star in the constellation Eridanus

τ^{9} Eridani
- Location of τ^{9} Eridani (circled in red)

Observation data Epoch J2000.0 Equinox ICRS
- Constellation: Eridanus
- Right ascension: 03^{h} 59^{m} 55.48381^{s}
- Declination: −24° 00′ 58.3798″
- Apparent magnitude (V): 4.63

Characteristics
- Evolutionary stage: main sequence
- Spectral type: B9.5V Si
- U−B color index: −0.40
- B−V color index: −0.13
- Variable type: α^{2} CVn

Astrometry
| Radial velocity (R_{v}) | 25.5±0.5 km/s |
| Proper motion (μ) | RA: +12.12 mas/yr Dec.: +16.48 mas/yr |
| Parallax (π) | 9.96±0.22 mas |
| Distance | 327 ± 7 ly (100 ± 2 pc) |
| Absolute magnitude (M_{V}) | −0.44 |

Orbit
| Period (P) | 5.95382 days |
| Eccentricity (e) | 0.129 |
| Periastron epoch (T) | 246991.65 JD |
| Argument of periastron (ω) (secondary) | 183.2° |
| Semi-amplitude (K_{1}) (primary) | 40.0 km/s |
| Semi-amplitude (K_{2}) (secondary) | 89.9 km/s |

Details

τ^{9} Eri A
| Mass | 3.6 M_{☉} |
| Radius | 3.06 R_{☉} |
| Luminosity | 209 L_{☉} |
| Surface gravity (log g) | 4.11±0.11 cgs |
| Temperature | 12,580 K |
| Rotational velocity (v sin i) | 26.8 km/s |
| Age | 140 Myr |

τ^{9} Eri B
| Mass | 1.6 M_{☉} |
| Radius | 1.5 R_{☉} |
| Luminosity | 6.3 L_{☉} |
| Temperature | 7530 K |
| Rotational velocity (v sin i) | 15 km/s |

Other designations
- τ^{9} Eridani, τ^{9} Eri, 36 Eridani, CD−24°2022, FK5 2287, HD 25267, HIP 18673, HR 1240, SAO 169017

Database references
| SIMBAD | data |

Tau^{9} Eridani (τ^{9} Eri) is a binary star in the constellation Eridanus. It is visible to the naked eye with an apparent visual magnitude of 4.63. The distance to this system can be estimated using the parallax method, which yields a value of roughly 327 light years.

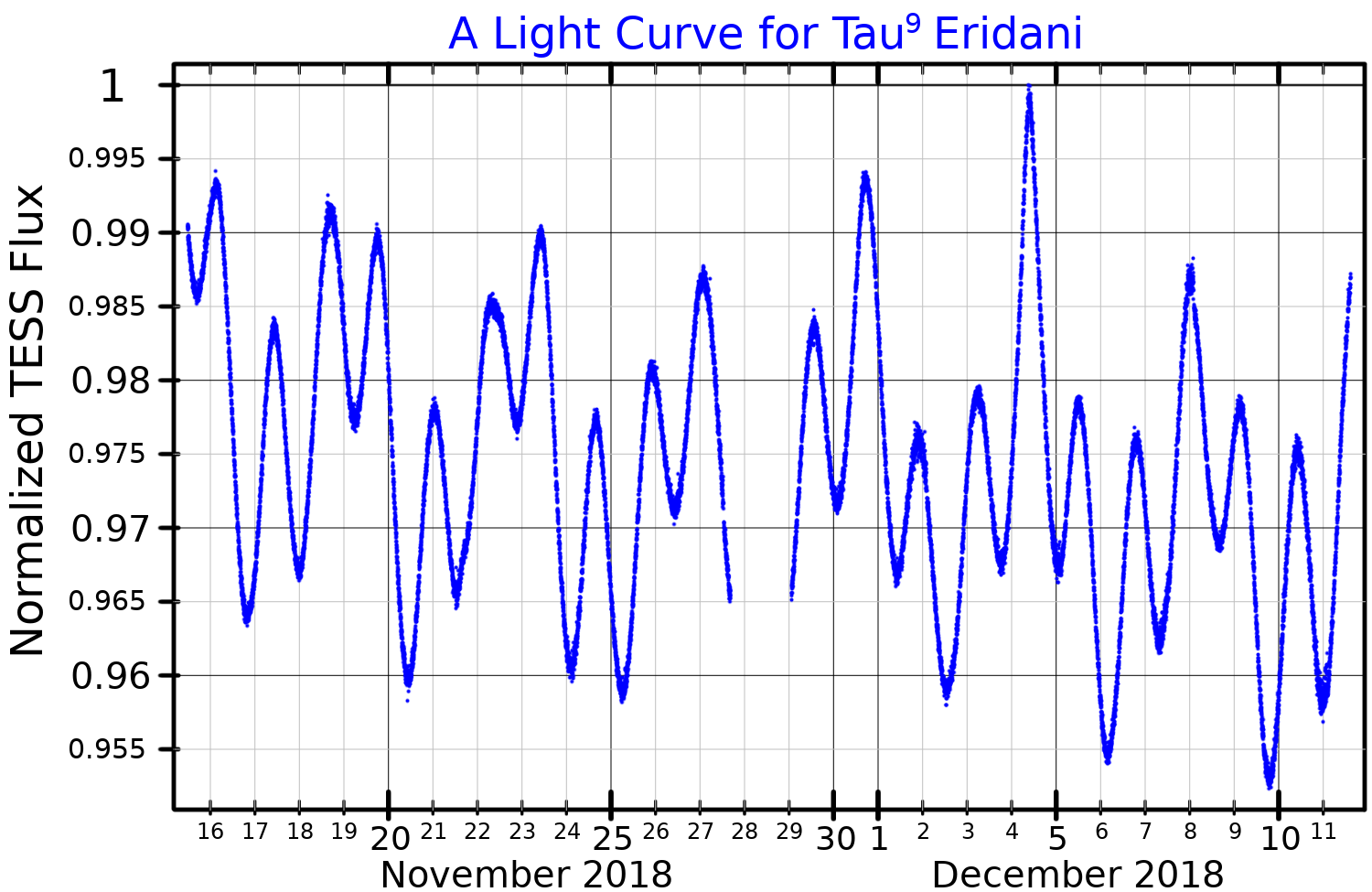
A light curve for Tau^{9} Eridani plotted from TESS data

This is a double-lined spectroscopic binary system with an orbital period of 5.95382 days and an eccentricity of 0.12. The primary component, τ^{9} Eri A, is a magnetic chemically peculiar star with a stellar classification of B9.5V Si, indicating that it is a B-type main sequence star that shows abundance anomalies in its silicon absorption lines. It is an Alpha² Canum Venaticorum variable with a rotational periodicity of 5.954 days. The averaged strength of the stellar effective magnetic field is 240.6±91.0 G.

The primary component Tau^{9} Eridani A has an estimated 326% the mass of the Sun and 3.1 times the Sun's radius. It shines with 166 times the solar luminosity from an outer atmosphere at an effective temperature of 10,866 K. The star is spinning with a projected rotational velocity of 30 km/s. The secondary star, designated Tau^{9} Eridani B, is a late A-type or early F-type star with a mass of 1.6 solar masses and an effective temperature of 7530 K.
