= Tau6 Eridani =

Star in the constellation Eridanus

τ^{6} Eridani
- Location of τ^{6} Eridani (circled in red)

Observation data Epoch J2000.0 Equinox ICRS
- Constellation: Eridanus
- Right ascension: 03^{h} 46^{m} 50.88819^{s}
- Declination: −23° 14′ 59.0046″
- Apparent magnitude (V): 4.22

Characteristics
- Evolutionary stage: main sequence
- Spectral type: F5IV-V
- U−B color index: −0.03
- B−V color index: +0.43

Astrometry
Radial velocity (R_{v})	8.0±0.8 km/s
Proper motion (μ)	RA: −158.84 mas/yr Dec.: −528.95 mas/yr
Parallax (π)	56.73±0.19 mas
Distance	57.5 ± 0.2 ly (17.63 ± 0.06 pc)
Absolute magnitude (M_{V})	2.98

Details
Mass	1.40+0.06 −0.04 M_{☉}
Radius	1.73±0.03 R_{☉}
Luminosity	5.29±0.27 L_{☉}
Surface gravity (log g)	4.141±0.090 cgs
Temperature	6,651+64 −54 K
Metallicity [Fe/H]	−0.03±0.11 dex
Rotational velocity (v sin i)	16.25 km/s
Age	2.17+0.38 −0.48 Gyr

Other designations
- τ^{6} Eri, 27 Eridani, CD−23°1565, FK5 140, GC 168827, GJ 155, HD 23754, HIP 17651, HR 1173, SAO 101600

Database references
SIMBAD	data

Tau^{6} Eridani, Latinized from τ^{6} Eridani, is a single star in the equatorial constellation of Eridanus, located near the constellation border with Fornax. It has a yellow-white hue with an apparent visual magnitude of 4.22, which is bright enough to be seen with the naked eye. Based upon parallax measurements, the distance to this star is around 57.5 light years. It is drifting further away with a radial velocity of +8 km/s.

The spectrum of Tau^{6} Eridani matches a stellar classification of F5IV-V, indicating it is an F-type star that shows traits of both a main sequence star and a subgiant. It has an estimated 140% of the Sun's mass and 1.73 times the radius of the Sun. The star is radiating 5.29 times the luminosity of the Sun at an effective temperature of 6,651 K, and it does not display any surface magnetic activity. The star has been examined for infrared excess emission that could indicate the presence of circumstellar matter, but none has been detected.
