= Tau7 Eridani =

Star in the constellation Eridanus

τ^{7} Eridani
- Location of τ^{7} Eridani (circled in red)

Observation data Epoch J2000.0 Equinox ICRS
- Constellation: Eridanus
- Right ascension: 03^{h} 47^{m} 39.65058^{s}
- Declination: −23° 52′ 28.8352″
- Apparent magnitude (V): 5.235

Characteristics
- Evolutionary stage: main sequence
- Spectral type: A3 Vs
- U−B color index: +0.168
- B−V color index: +0.067

Astrometry
Radial velocity (R_{v})	28.4±0.5 km/s
Proper motion (μ)	RA: +47.46 mas/yr Dec.: +49.10 mas/yr
Parallax (π)	13.00±0.28 mas
Distance	251 ± 5 ly (77 ± 2 pc)
Absolute magnitude (M_{V})	+0.81

Details

τ^{7} Eri A
Mass	2.03 M_{☉}
Luminosity	37.6 L_{☉}
Surface gravity (log g)	3.86±0.2 cgs
Temperature	8,740±200 K
Rotational velocity (v sin i)	18 km/s
Age	387 Myr

Other designations
- τ^{7} Eridani, τ^{7} Eri, 28 Eridani, CD−24°1877, HD 23878, HIP 17717, HR 1181, SAO 168836

Database references
SIMBAD	data

Tau^{7} Eridani is a solitary star in the constellation Eridanus. It is visible to the naked eye with an apparent visual magnitude of 5.235. Using the parallax method, the distance to this star can be estimated as around 251 light years.

This is an A-type main sequence star with a stellar classification of A3 Vs, where the 's' indicates it has narrow absorption lines. It may be a chemically peculiar Am star, which means it displays unusual abundances of certain elements in its surface layers. Tau^{7} Eridani appears to be a low amplitude variable that displays slight fluctuations in luminosity over a period of 7.17 days. It is slowly rotating with a projected rotational velocity of 18 km/s, and is around 387 million years old.
