= Hairy Head =

Chinese constellation

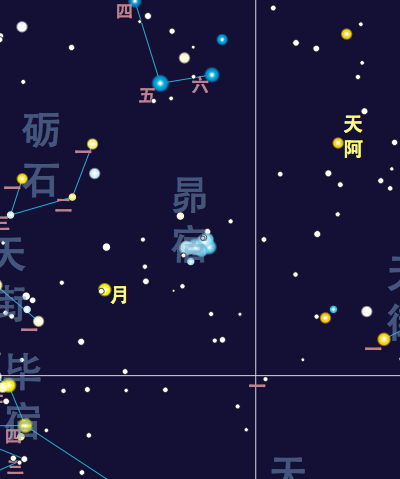
Mǎo Xiù map

The Hairy Head mansion (昴宿, pinyin: Mǎo Xiù) is one of the Twenty-eight mansions of the Chinese constellations. It is one of the western mansions of the White Tiger.

This mansion corresponds to the Pleiades in English.

== Asterisms ==
English name	Chinese name	European constellation	Number of stars	Representing
Hairy Head	昴	Taurus/Pleiades	7	The maned head
Celestial River	天河	Aries	1	River in the sky
Moon	月	Taurus	1	Moon spirit
Yin Force	天陰	Aries/Taurus	5	Overcast sky force, or the shadows of north mountain, or officials of the emperor which hunting together
Hay	芻蒿	Cetus	6	Hay and cattle food
Celestial Meadows	天苑	Cetus/Eridanus	16	Imperial family's ranch
Rolled Tongue	卷舌	Perseus	6	Shape of the curled tongue
Celestial Slander	天讒	Perseus	1	Slanderous tongue
Whetstone	礪石	Andromeda/Perseus/Taurus	4	Grindstone
