= Peripheral nebular regions of the Orion Complex =

Peripheral nebular regions of the Orion Molecular Cloud Complex

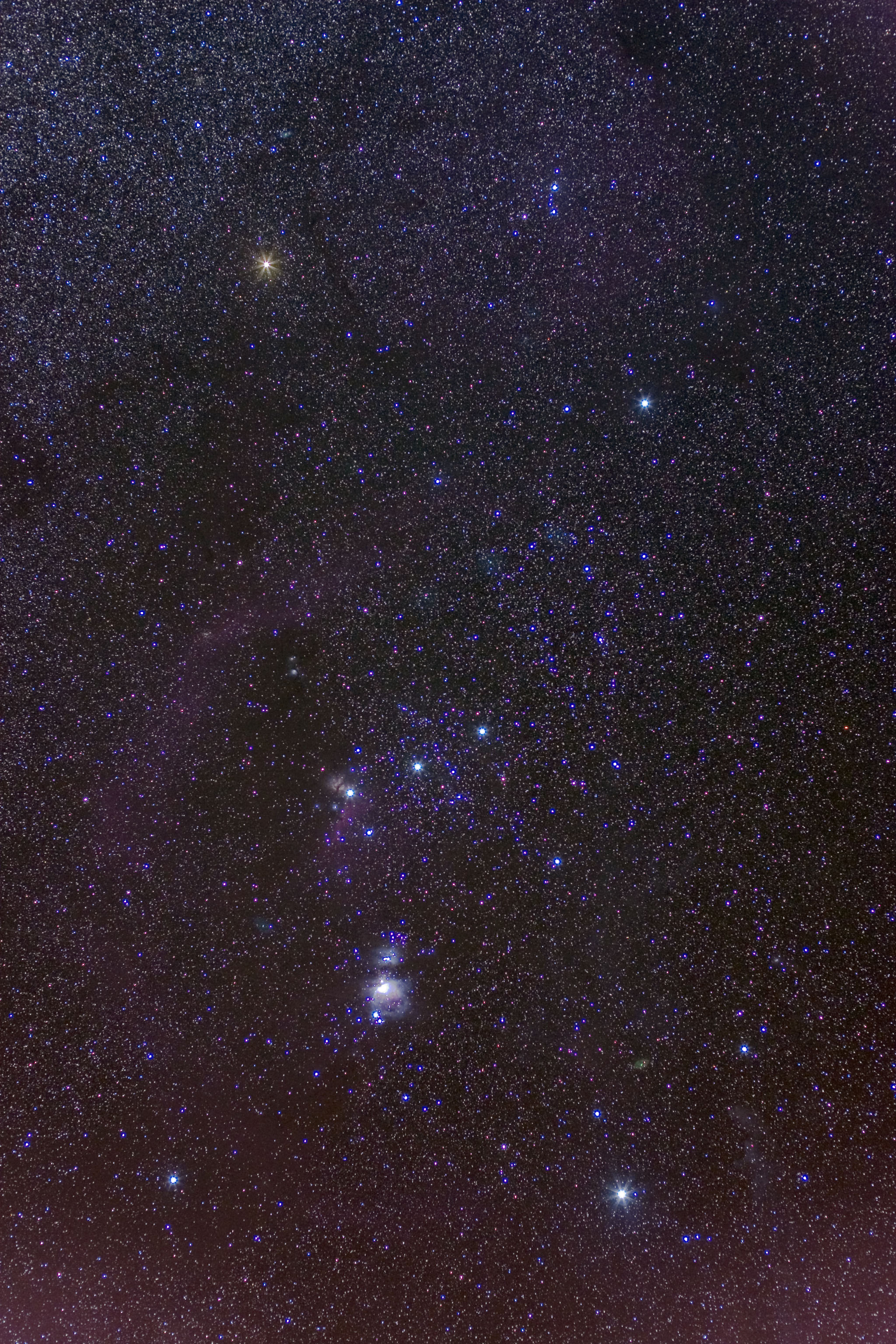
The constellation of Orion; the gas arc formed by Barnard's Loop is visible on the left, with the brighter complexes, such as the Orion Nebula, at the center.

The peripheral nebular regions of the Orion Complex typically include small clouds and clumps of interstellar dust located on the outermost edges of the large nebular complex to which they belong. Most of these clouds are situated in the western part of the complex, spanning the constellations of Orion and Eridanus.

These clouds often exhibit a "cometary" and elongated appearance due to the impact of the stellar wind from the brightest stars of the Orion OB1 association. Consequently, they display a "tail" of dissolving gas in the opposite direction from these stars. This interaction has, in some cases, also facilitated star formation processes.

== General Characteristics ==
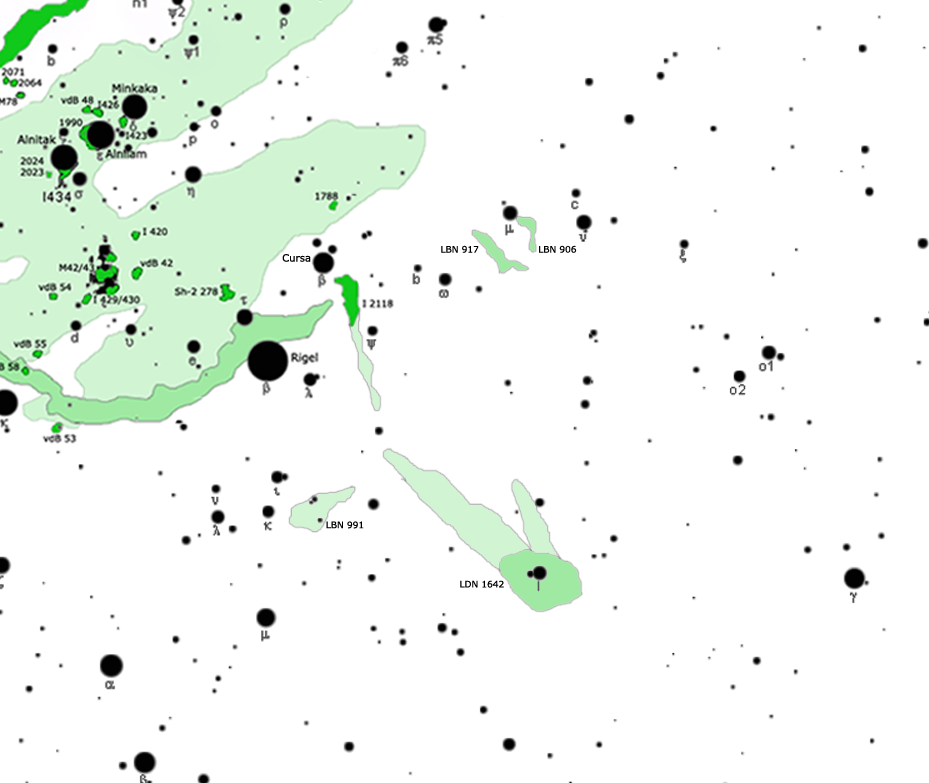
Map of the regions southwest of the constellation Orion.

The small clumps of gas and forming stars in the outermost regions of the Orion complex are scattered over an area exceeding 600 square degrees. Most of these cocoons are invisible to the naked eye and small instruments but are more easily detected in long-exposure images, particularly in the infrared band. The shaping of these clumps is primarily driven by the ultraviolet radiation from massive, blue stars of spectral classes O and B. This shaping action is responsible for the characteristic "comet-like" form of the outer nebulae associated with H II regions. Similar erosive phenomena are observed in other nebulae, such as the famous Pillars of Creation within the Eagle Nebula. In the outer regions of the Orion complex, 89 clouds associated with infrared sources observed by IRAS have been cataloged, distributed north and south of the celestial equator and linked to Herbig-Haro objects.

The distance of these peripheral clouds, compared to the average distance of the central clouds in the complex, indicates that they are closer to the Solar System relative to the complex itself. Specifically, clouds visually closer to the central regions are also the nearest to the complex's center, while fragments at high galactic latitudes interacting with the outer edge of the Orion–Eridanus Superbubble are closer to us. For example, the cloud LDN 1634, at a distance of 450 parsecs, is the closest to Orion A and the famous Orion Nebula; nebulae on the border between Taurus and Eridanus, such as the Witch Head Nebula, lie at about 230 parsecs, while those further west are as close as 150–200 parsecs from the Sun.

== Western edge nebular regions ==
=== LDN 1634 ===
LDN 1634 is the closest to the Orion A region, located about 3° from it. It is a small dark nebula containing some partially illuminated sections, such as LBN 960. Other small illuminated fragments, like LBN 956 and LBN 957, are scattered around it. Two theories explain the cloud's origin: one suggests it may be material ejected by the pressure of the wind from the young, hot stars of the Orion OB1 association, while the other posits it as a remnant of the star formation process within the association.

LDN 1634 hosts two of the most well-known and studied Herbig-Haro objects, HH 240 and HH 241. Both feature prominent jets, which have provided significant insights into the mechanisms of this class of objects. In the H2 band, they appear as powerful bipolar jets extending east-west from the infrared source cataloged as IRAS 05173-0555, which has a nebulous, elongated appearance with a strong reddened component typical of HH objects. The jets span a total of 6', equivalent to 0.8 pc (2.6 light-years) at a distance of 450 pc (1470 ly). The brightest points are labeled A, B, C, and D and their spectra show strong emissions in the Fe II lines, which decrease with distance from the jet source, and in H2.

The cloud also contains several stars with Hα emission lines, particularly on its eastern side, indicating active star formation. At least three of these are T Tauri stars, coinciding with IRAS or X-ray sources.

=== NGC 1788 and surroundings ===
NGC 1788 is a small reflection nebula located about 6° west of the densest regions of the Orion complex, on the border between the constellations of Orion and Eridanus, just north of the star Cursa (β Eridani). It is an illuminated portion of a gas and dust system known as LDN 1616 and LDN 1615, extending just under a degree in an east-west orientation, at a distance of about 450 pc (1470 ly) from the Solar System. The eastern, illuminated part hosts the star HD 293815, a blue star that illuminates it.

Evidence of star formation is provided by infrared sources identified in the 2000s, which correspond to Class 0 protostars (the youngest), with a powerful jet originating from the most massive one. Their distribution and age suggest that this star formation cycle was triggered by the impact of the shock wave from the wind of the young stars in the Orion OB1 association.

The brightest stellar and protostellar components of the reflection nebula are enveloped in small clouds that exhibit H2 emissions. One of these is likely caused by the strong ultraviolet radiation from the central, most massive star, while the other two appear associated with bow shocks. These latter two are, in fact, Herbig-Haro objects, numbered as HH 951-A and HH 951-B.

Approximately sixty pre-main-sequence stars have been discovered, including HD 293815 and the Herbig Ae/Be star UX Orionis. The latter, located about 45' west of the clouds, is the prototype of a particular class of variable stars known as UX Orionis variables (UXor). It is a white star of spectral class A3 with an age of 2 million years, coinciding with the IRAS source 05020-0351.

=== Witch Head Nebula ===
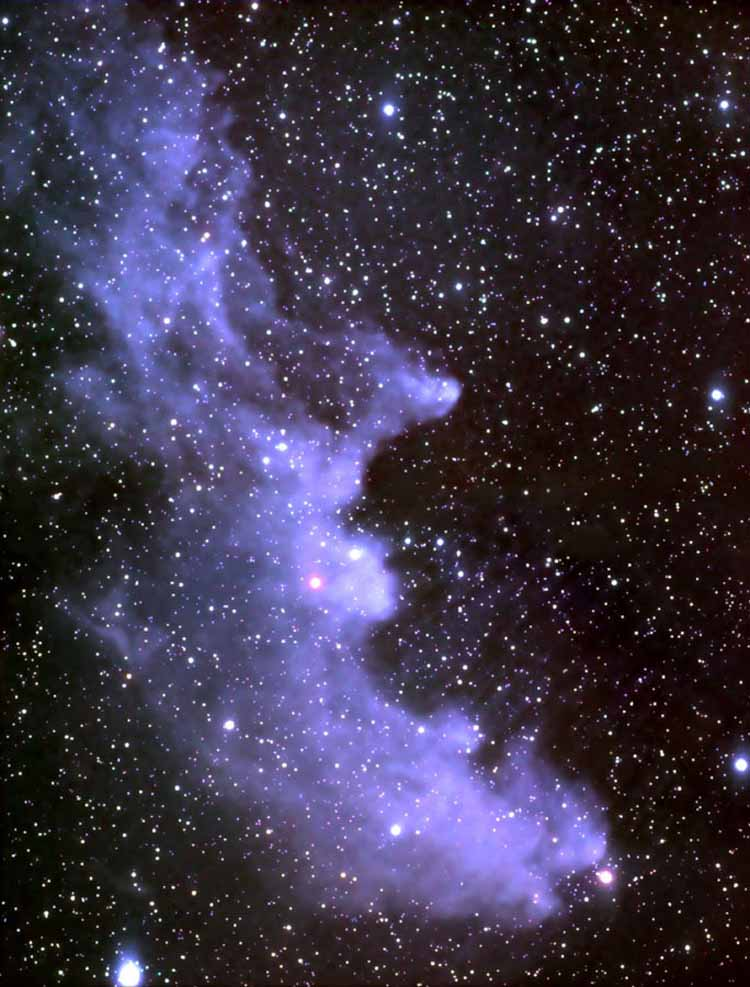
The Witch Head Nebula, in Eridanus, a well-known reflection nebula. North is at the bottom.

The Witch Head Nebula (IC 2118) is a well-known reflection nebula located in the northeastern part of the constellation Eridanus, just south of Cursa and about eight degrees west of Orion A. The source of the light it reflects is likely the bright star Rigel (β Orionis), located about two degrees east. The cloud is approximately 210 pc (685 ly) from us and contains denser, brighter regions that are listed separately in some catalogs, such as the Lynds' catalogs, which include the substructures LBN 968, LBN 959, and LBN 975.

From an evolutionary perspective, this nebula and its associated gas clouds are classified as a remnant of a molecular cloud. Star formation is evidenced by the presence of infrared sources, such as IRAS 04591-0856 and IRAS 05050-0614, which exhibit infrared flux intensities typical of young stellar objects. Some of the cloud's substructures display a cometary shape with tails pointing away from the stars of the Orion OB1 association, indicating that the cloud's gases are subject to the photoevaporative action of its most massive stars.

The cloud contains five T Tauri stars, three of which are also cataloged as infrared sources. A comparative study of their evolutionary tracks (Hayashi + Henyey) estimates their age at about 2.5 million years. According to the same study, these stars are related and likely formed together due to the shock wave from the radiation pressure and wind of the Orion OB1 association stars. Additionally, there are three other young stars, two of which may exhibit T Tauri characteristics due to significant spectral variations; these two candidates coincide with IRAS sources. Four other stars of the same class are scattered around the cloud but may not be physically associated with it, appearing in its direction only due to a perspective effect.]

== Minor and 0utermost nebular regions ==
Many of the most peripheral and remote clouds of the Orion Complex extend to high galactic latitudes, far from the galactic plane, and are primarily visible in the constellation of Eridanus and on the westernmost edge of Orion.

=== LDN 1642 ===
LDN 1642 is one of the better-known clouds located far from the Milky Way's trail. It is a relatively cold and tranquil dark nebula situated in the central northern part of Eridanus, almost entirely devoid of vigorous dynamics and composed of neutral molecular hydrogen (H I region). Spanning over four degrees with a cometary appearance, its tail extends more than five degrees northeast, perpendicular to the galactic plane, fading toward the central regions of the complex. The cloud visually overlaps with the outermost edge of the Eridanus Bubble, with which it appears to interact. Its prominence is due to being one of only two high-latitude galactic clouds hosting, albeit on a very small scale, star formation processes.

The nebula's structure can be divided into three denser regions connected by a more diffuse interstellar medium. Two dust filaments extend from the center toward the northeast and east. Studies of the density of the cloud's substructures suggest that only the densest parts are gravitationally bound, while the others are not. Near the region of highest density are two faint pre-main-sequence stars surrounded by nebulosity, detected in the infrared: the first is cataloged as L 1642-1 (or, per traditional variable star designation, EW Eridani), and the second is L 1642-2. The latter is responsible for the stellar wind driving the gas jets of the Herbig-Haro object HH 123, discovered in the early 1990s. It has an elongated, poorly defined shape, with structural indications suggesting the presence of two bow shocks directed in opposite directions.

=== Other Clouds ===
The southernmost part of the complex, south of Rigel, consists of the cloud LBN 991. Located about eight degrees southwest of Orion A, it contains an X-ray source, RX J0513.4-1244. This cloud, situated within the boundaries of the constellation Lepus, is cataloged as a bright diffuse nebula, though it is very faint. The presence of a T Tauri star, coinciding with the X-ray source, indicates that limited star formation processes have occurred within the cloud.

LBN 906 and LBN 917 are two small cometary clouds in the constellation Eridanus, relatively close to each other. They are likely small portions of molecular gas ejected from the Orion region or, alternatively, cocoons aggregated by interaction with the expanding superbubble surrounding the Orion Complex, thus directly connected to the Eridanus Bubble. Near these two nebulae is a known IRAS source, cataloged as IRAS 04451-0539, which coincides with a T Tauri star identified based on its H emissions and strong Li absorption.

== Lambda Orionis Region ==
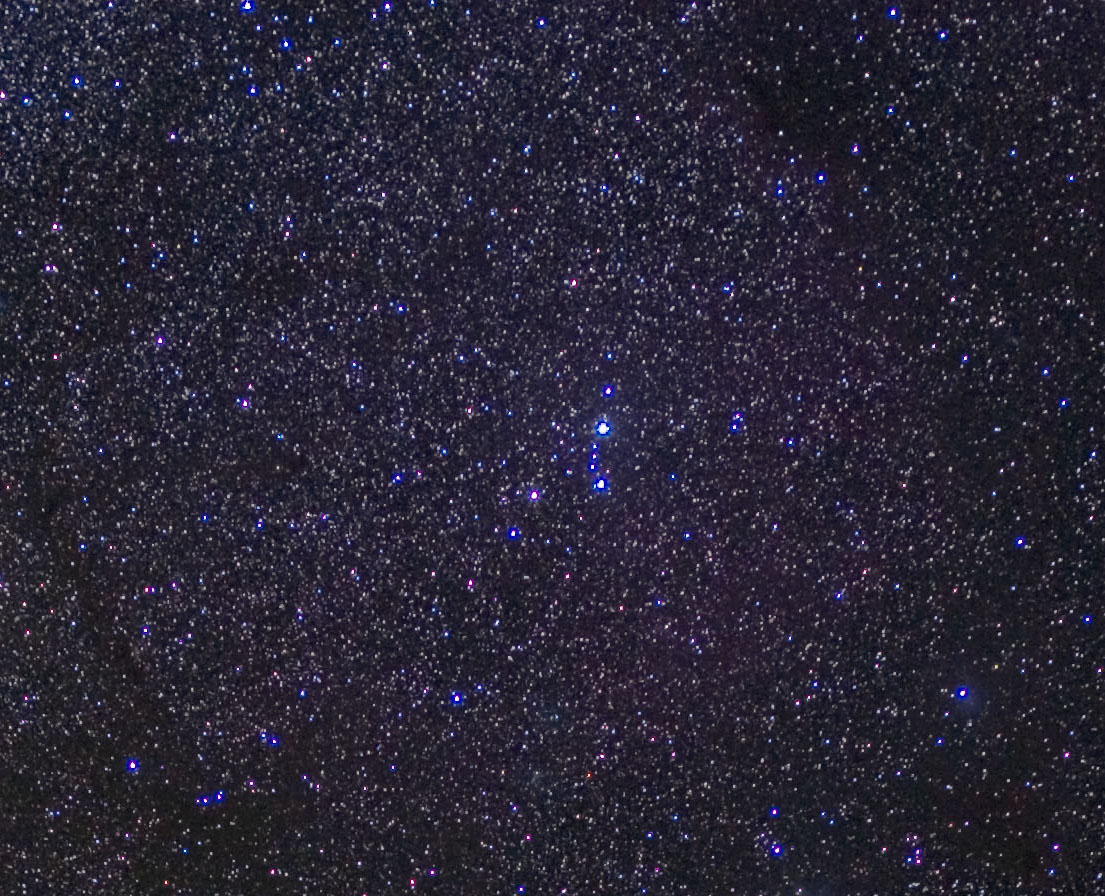
The Lambda Orionis region.

In the northernmost part of the Orion Complex, north of the large quadrilateral of stars forming the backbone of the constellation Orion, lies a relatively bright, small OB association cataloged as Cr 69, known as the Lambda Orionis Association. Its dominant star, λ Orionis (Heka), is easily visible to the naked eye and leads a group of about a dozen blue stars of spectral class B. The association's components are all clearly visible through binoculars. The association's distance is estimated at approximately 400 parsecs, corresponding to a real diameter of about 55 parsecs for the nebula associated with it.

According to evolutionary models, the association is at a relatively advanced stage, with its components being gravitationally loosely bound. The average age of its stars is around 6 million years.

λ^{1} Orionis is a star of spectral class O8 III (a blue giant) and is the primary ionizer of a large, roughly symmetrical system of ionized gas, clearly visible in the infrared, with a diameter of about eight degrees and slightly brighter on the western side. Within this system, approximately eighty objects are known, most of which are Herbig Ae/Be stars and young T Tauri stars, indicating that the cloud hosts star formation processes for intermediate- or low-mass stars. The cloud is cataloged as Sh2-264, and the innermost part, near the ionizing stars, shows signs of expansion. This expansion is suspected to have been caused by the explosion of a Type II supernova approximately 300,000 years ago or slightly more, which altered what was originally a relatively flat cloud. According to this hypothesis, which also considers the proper motion of λ Orionis, the supernova likely originated from a companion star of λ Orionis, which evolved more rapidly due to its greater mass, thus completing its lifecycle earlier. Surrounding the main cloud are several angularly distant but related clouds, such as Sh2-262 and Sh2-265, visible to the southwest.

== See also ==
- Orion (constellation)
- Nebula
- Barnard's Loop
- Orion Arm
- Orion Molecular Cloud Complex
- Orion Nebula
- OB association
- Star formation
- Giant molecular cloud
- H II region
- Blue giant
- Blue supergiant star
- Superbubble

== Bibliography ==
=== General works ===
- O'Meara, Stephen James (2007). Deep Sky Companions: Hidden Treasures. Cambridge University Press. ISBN 978-0-521-83704-0.
- Robert Burnham, Jr (1978). Burnham's Celestial Handbook: Volume Two. New York: Dover Publications, Inc.
- Chaisson, E.; McMillan, S. (1993). Astronomy Today. Englewood Cliffs: Prentice-Hall, Inc. ISBN 0-13-240085-5.
- Arny, Thomas T. (2007). Explorations: An Introduction to Astronomy (3 updated ed.). Boston: McGraw-Hill. ISBN 978-0-07-321369-9.
- AA.VV (2002). L'Universo - Grande enciclopedia dell'astronomia [The Universe - Great Encyclopedia of Astronomy] (in Italian). Novara: De Agostini.
- Gribbin, J. (2005). Enciclopedia di astronomia e cosmologia [Encyclopedia of Astronomy and Cosmology] (in Italian). Milano: Garzanti. ISBN 88-11-50517-8.
- Owen, W. (2006). Atlante illustrato dell'Universo [Illustrated Atlas of the Universe] (in Italian). Milano: Il Viaggiatore. ISBN 88-365-3679-4.
- Lindstrom, J. (2006). Stelle, galassie e misteri cosmici [Stars, Galaxies, and Cosmic Mysteries] (in Italian). Trieste: Editoriale Scienza. ISBN 88-7307-326-3.

=== On stellar evolution ===
- Lada, C. J.; N. D. Kylafits (1999). The Origin of Stars and Planetary Systems. Kluwer Academic Publishers. ISBN 0-7923-5909-7.
- De Blasi, A. (2002). Le stelle: nascita, evoluzione e morte [The Stars: Birth, Evolution, and Death] (in Italian). Bologna: CLUEB. ISBN 88-491-1832-5.
- Abbondi, C. (2007). Universo in evoluzione dalla nascita alla morte delle stelle [Evolving Universe from the Birth to the Death of Stars] (in Italian). Sandit. ISBN 978-88-89150-32-0.
- Hack, M. (2004). Dove nascono le stelle. Dalla vita ai quark: un viaggio a ritroso alle origini dell'Universo [Where Stars Are Born. From Life to Quarks: A Journey Back to the Origins of the Universe] (in Italian). Milano: Sperling & Kupfer. ISBN 88-8274-912-6.

=== On the Orion Complex ===
- Bally, J. (2008). "Overview of the Orion Complex". Handbook of Star Forming Regions, Volume I: The Northern Sky ASP Monograph Publications. 4: 1. Bibcode:2008hsf1.book..459B.
- Mathieu, R. D. (2008). "The λ Orionis Star Forming Region". Handbook of Star Forming Regions, Volume I: The Northern Sky ASP Monograph Publications. 4: 1. Bibcode:2008hsf1.book..757M.
- Alcalá, J. M.; Covino, E.; Leccia, S. (2008). "Orion Outlying Clouds". Handbook of Star Forming Regions, Volume I: The Northern Sky ASP Monograph Publications. 4: 1. Bibcode:2008hsf1.book..801A.

=== Star charts ===
- Toshimi Taki (2005). "Taki's 8.5 Magnitude Star Atlas" [Taki's 8.5 Magnitude Star Atlas]. Archived from the original on November 5, 2018. - Freely downloadable star atlas in PDF format.
- Tirion, W.; Rappaport, B.; Lovi, G. (1987). Uranometria 2000.0 - Volume I - The Northern Hemisphere to -6°. Richmond, Virginia, USA: Willmann-Bell, inc. ISBN 0-943396-14-X.
- Tirion, W.; Sinnott, R. (1998). Sky Atlas 2000.0 (2 ed.). Cambridge, USA: Cambridge University Press. ISBN 0-933346-90-5.
- Tirion, W. (2001). The Cambridge Star Atlas 2000.0 (3 ed.). Cambridge, USA: Cambridge University Press. ISBN 0-521-80084-6.
