= Tau Orionis =

Star in the constellation Orion

τ Orionis
- Location of τ Orionis (circled in red)

Observation data Epoch J2000.0 Equinox J2000.0 (ICRS)
- Constellation: Orion
- Right ascension: 05^{h} 17^{m} 36.38856^{s}
- Declination: −06° 50′ 39.8702″
- Apparent magnitude (V): 3.58

Characteristics
- Spectral type: B5 III
- U−B color index: −0.47
- B−V color index: −0.11

Astrometry
Radial velocity (R_{v})	+20.1 km/s
Proper motion (μ)	RA: −17.61 mas/yr Dec.: −9.24 mas/yr
Parallax (π)	6.60±0.15 mas
Distance	490 ± 10 ly (152 ± 3 pc)

Orbit
Period (P)	90.29 days
Eccentricity (e)	0.834
Inclination (i)	30°
Longitude of the node (Ω)	156°

Details

A
Mass	6 M_{☉}

B
Mass	6 M_{☉}

Other designations
- τ Ori, 20 Orionis, BD−07°1028, HD 34503, HIP 24674, HR 1735, SAO 131952.

Database references
SIMBAD	data

Tau Orionis (τ Ori, τ Orionis) is a binary star in the constellation Orion. If an imaginary line is drawn north-west between the stars Rigel and Mintaka, Tau Orionis can be found roughly one-sixth of the way to Mintaka. It is visible to the naked eye with a combined apparent visual magnitude of 3.58. Based upon an annual parallax shift of 6.6 mas, it is located around 490 light years distant.

This is a spectroscopic binary system with an orbital period of 90 days and a very high eccentricity of 0.834. It is a heartbeat star, showing variations on its apparent magnitude during the close periastron passage. The components have equal masses of 6 M_{☉} and a combined stellar classification of B5 III. The star has a peculiar velocity through space of 16.9 km/s.

Tau Orionis has three visual companions: magnitude 11.0 component B at an angular separation of 33.30″ along a position angle of 251°; magnitude 10.9 component C lying some 3.80″ from component B; and magnitude 10.9 component D at 36.0″ from τ Ori along a position angle of 51°, all as of 2011.

== Proper names ==
According to Richard H. Allen, this star, along with β Eri, λ Eri and ψ Eri were Al Kursiyy al Jauzah, "the Chair (or "Footstool") of the Central One". However, per the catalogue of stars in the Technical Memorandum 33-507 - A Reduced Star Catalog Containing 537 Named Stars, Al Kursiyy al Jauzah were the title for just three stars: β Eri as Cursa, ψ Eri as Al Kursiyy al Jauzah I and λ Eri as Al Kursiyy al Jauzah II, excluding this star.

In Chinese, 玉井 (Yù Jǐng), meaning Jade Well, refers to an asterism consisting of τ Orionis, β Eridani, λ Eridani and ψ Eridani. Consequently, the Chinese name for τ Orionis itself is 玉井四 (Yù Jǐng sì, English: the Fourth Star of Jade Well.). From this Chinese title, the name Yuh Tsing is derived.
