= Rigel =

Brightest star in the constellation Orion

- Location of Rigel (circled)

Observation data Epoch J2000 Equinox ICRS
- Constellation: Orion
- Pronunciation: /ˈraɪdʒəl/ or /-ɡəl/
- A
- Right ascension: 05^{h} 14^{m} 32.27210^{s}
- Declination: −08° 12′ 05.8981″
- Apparent magnitude (V): 0.13 to 0.12 (0.05–0.18)
- BC
- Right ascension: 05^{h} 14^{m} 32.049^{s}
- Declination: −08° 12′ 14.78″
- Apparent magnitude (V): 6.67 (7.5/7.6)

Characteristics

A
- Evolutionary stage: Blue supergiant
- Spectral type: B8 Ia
- U−B color index: −0.66
- B−V color index: −0.03
- Variable type: Alpha Cygni

BC
- Evolutionary stage: Main sequence
- Spectral type: B9V + B9V

Astrometry

A
Radial velocity (R_{v})	17.8±0.4 km/s
Proper motion (μ)	RA: +1.31 mas/yr Dec.: +0.50 mas/yr
Parallax (π)	3.78±0.34 mas
Distance	848±65 ly (260±20 pc)
Absolute magnitude (M_{V})	−7.92±0.28

BC
Radial velocity (R_{v})	17.8±0.4 km/s
Proper motion (μ)	RA: −0.034 mas/yr Dec.: −0.017 mas/yr
Parallax (π)	3.2352±0.0553 mas
Distance	1,010 ± 20 ly (309 ± 5 pc)

Orbit
Primary	A
Secondary	BC
Period (P)	24,000 yr

Orbit
Primary	Ba
Secondary	Bb
Period (P)	9.860 days
Eccentricity (e)	0.1
Semi-amplitude (K_{1}) (primary)	25.0 km/s
Semi-amplitude (K_{2}) (secondary)	32.6 km/s

Orbit
Primary	B
Secondary	C
Period (P)	63 yr

Details

A
Mass	21±3 M_{☉}
Radius	74.1+6.1 −7.3 R_{☉}
Luminosity (bolometric)	120,000+25,000 −21,000 L_{☉}
Surface gravity (log g)	1.75±0.10 cgs
Temperature	12,100±150 K
Metallicity [Fe/H]	−0.06±0.10 dex
Rotational velocity (v sin i)	25±3 km/s
Age	8±1 Myr

Ba
Mass	3.84 M_{☉}

Bb
Mass	2.94 M_{☉}

C
Mass	3.84 M_{☉}

Other designations
- β Orionis, ADS 3823, STF 668, BU 555, H II 33, CCDM J05145-0812, WDS J05145-0812
- A: Rigel, Algebar, Elgebar, 19 Orionis, HD 34085, HR 1713, HIP 24436, SAO 131907, BD−08°1063, FK5 194
- B: Rigel B, GCRV 3111

Database references
SIMBAD	Rigel
- Rigel B

Rigel is a blue supergiant star in the equatorial constellation of Orion. It has the Bayer designation β Orionis, which is Latinized to Beta Orionis and abbreviated Beta Ori or β Ori. Rigel is the brightest and most massive component – and the eponym – of a star system of at least four stars that appear as a single blue-white point of light to the naked eye. This system is located at a distance of approximately 850 light-years (260 pc).

A star of spectral type B8Ia, Rigel is calculated to be anywhere from 61,500 to 363,000 times as luminous as the Sun, and 18 to 24 times as massive, depending on the method and assumptions used. Its radius is more than seventy times that of the Sun, and its surface temperature is 12,100 K. Due to its stellar wind, Rigel's mass-loss is estimated to be ten million times that of the Sun. With an estimated age of seven to nine million years, Rigel has exhausted its core hydrogen fuel, expanded, and cooled to become a supergiant. It is expected to end its life as a Type II supernova, leaving a neutron star or a black hole as a final remnant, depending on the initial mass of the star.

Rigel varies slightly in brightness, its apparent magnitude ranging from 0.05 to 0.18. It is classified as an Alpha Cygni variable due to the amplitude and periodicity of its brightness variation, as well as its spectral type. Its intrinsic variability is caused by pulsations in its unstable atmosphere. Rigel is generally the seventh-brightest star in the night sky and the brightest star in Orion, though it is occasionally outshone by Betelgeuse, which varies over a larger range.

A triple-star system is separated from Rigel by an angle of 9.5 arc seconds. It has an apparent magnitude of 6.7, making it 1/400th as bright as Rigel. Two stars in the system can be seen by large telescopes, and the brighter of the two is a spectroscopic binary. These three stars are all blue-white main-sequence stars, each three to four times as massive as the Sun. Rigel and the triple system orbit a common center of gravity with a period estimated to be 24,000 years. The inner stars of the triple system orbit each other every 10 days, and the outer star orbits the inner pair every 63 years. A much fainter star, separated from Rigel and the others by nearly an arc minute, may be part of the same star system.

== Nomenclature ==
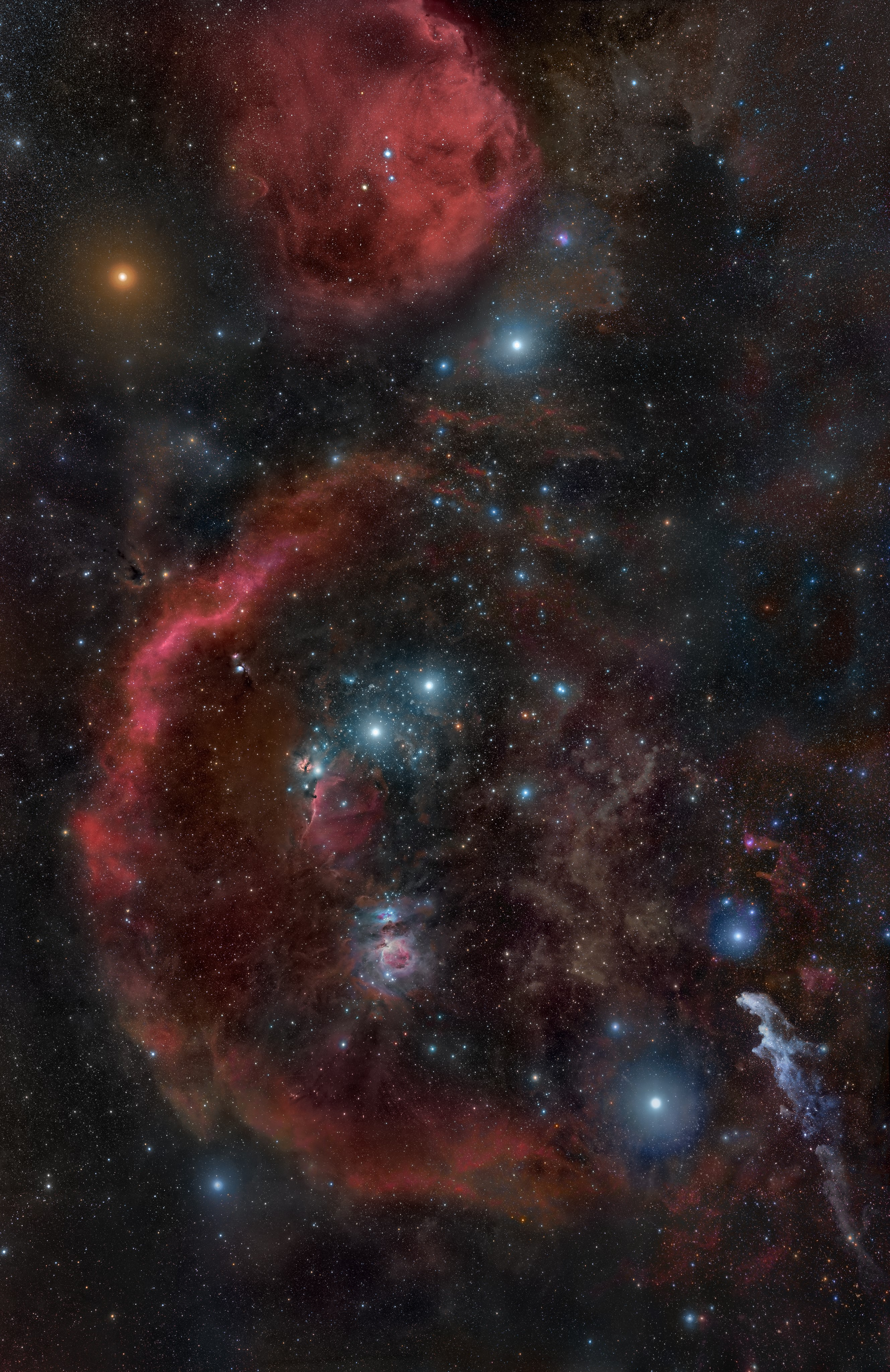
Orion, with Rigel at bottom right, at optical wavelengths plus the Hα (hydrogen-alpha) spectral line to emphasize gas clouds

In 2016, the International Astronomical Union (IAU) included the name "Rigel" in the IAU Catalog of Star Names. According to the IAU, this proper name applies only to the primary component A of the Rigel system. The system is listed variously in historical astronomical catalogs as H II 33, Σ 668, β 555, or ADS 3823. For simplicity, Rigel's companions are referred to as Rigel B, C, and D; the IAU describes such names as "useful nicknames" that are "unofficial". In modern comprehensive catalogs, the whole multiple star system is known as WDS 05145-0812 or CCDM 05145–0812.

The designation of Rigel as β Orionis (Beta Orionis) was made by Johann Bayer in 1603. The "beta" designation is commonly given to the second-brightest star in each constellation, but Rigel is almost always brighter than α Orionis (Betelgeuse). Astronomer James B. Kaler has speculated that Rigel was designated by Bayer during a rare period when it was outshone by the variable star Betelgeuse, resulting in the latter star being designated "alpha" and Rigel designated "beta". Bayer did not strictly order the stars by brightness, instead grouping them by magnitude. Rigel and Betelgeuse were both considered to be of the first magnitude class, and in Orion the stars of each class are thought to have been ordered north to south. Rigel is included in the General Catalogue of Variable Stars, but since it already has a Bayer designation it has no separate variable star designation.

Rigel has many other stellar designations taken from various catalogs, including the Flamsteed designation 19 Orionis (19 Ori), the Bright Star Catalogue entry HR 1713, and the Henry Draper Catalogue number HD 34085. These designations frequently appear in the scientific literature, but rarely in popular writing.

== Observation ==
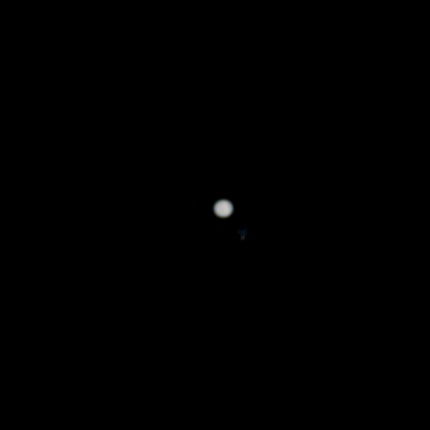
Rigel A and Rigel B as they appear in a small telescope

Rigel is an intrinsic variable star with an apparent magnitude ranging from 0.05 to 0.18. It is typically the seventh-brightest star in the celestial sphere, excluding the Sun, although occasionally fainter than Betelgeuse. It is the fifth-brightest star as seen from mid-northern latitudes. It is fainter than Capella, which may also vary slightly in brightness. Rigel appears slightly blue-white and has a B-V color index of −0.06. It contrasts strongly with reddish Betelgeuse.

Culminating every year at midnight on 12 December, and at 9:00 pm on 24 January, Rigel is visible on winter evenings in the Northern Hemisphere and on summer evenings in the Southern Hemisphere. In the Southern Hemisphere, Rigel is the first bright star of Orion visible as the constellation rises. Correspondingly, it is also the first star of Orion to set in most of the Northern Hemisphere. The star is a vertex of the "Winter Hexagon", an asterism that includes Aldebaran, Capella, Pollux, Procyon, and Sirius. Rigel is a prominent equatorial navigation star, being easily located and readily visible in all the world's oceans (the exception is the area north of the 82nd parallel north).

=== Spectroscopy ===
Rigel's spectral type is a defining point of the classification sequence for supergiants. The overall spectrum is typical for a late B class star, with strong absorption lines of the hydrogen Balmer series as well as neutral helium lines and some of heavier elements such as oxygen, calcium, and magnesium. The luminosity class for B8 stars is estimated from the strength and narrowness of the hydrogen spectral lines, and Rigel is assigned to the bright supergiant class Ia. Variations in the spectrum have resulted in the assignment of different classes to Rigel, such as B8 Ia, B8 Iab, and B8 Iae.

As early as 1888, the heliocentric radial velocity of Rigel, as estimated from the Doppler shifts of its spectral lines, was seen to vary. This was confirmed and interpreted at the time as being due to a spectroscopic companion with a period of about 22 days. The radial velocity has since been measured to vary by about 10 km/s around a mean of 21.5 km/s.

In 1933, the Hα line in Rigel's spectrum was seen to be unusually weak and shifted 0.1 nm towards shorter wavelengths, while there was a narrow emission spike about 1.5 nm to the long wavelength side of the main absorption line. This is now known as a P Cygni profile after a star that shows this feature strongly in its spectrum. It is associated with mass loss where there is simultaneously emission from a dense wind close to the star and absorption from circumstellar material expanding away from the star.

The unusual Hα line profile is observed to vary unpredictably. It is a normal absorption line around a third of the time. About a quarter of the time, it is a double-peaked line, that is, an absorption line with an emission core or an emission line with an absorption core. About a quarter of the time it has a P Cygni profile; most of the rest of the time, the line has an inverse P Cygni profile, where the emission component is on the short wavelength side of the line. Rarely, there is a pure emission Hα line. The line profile changes are interpreted as variations in the quantity and velocity of material being expelled from the star. Occasional very high-velocity outflows have been inferred, and, more rarely, infalling material. The overall picture is one of large looping structures arising from the photosphere and driven by magnetic fields.

=== Variability ===
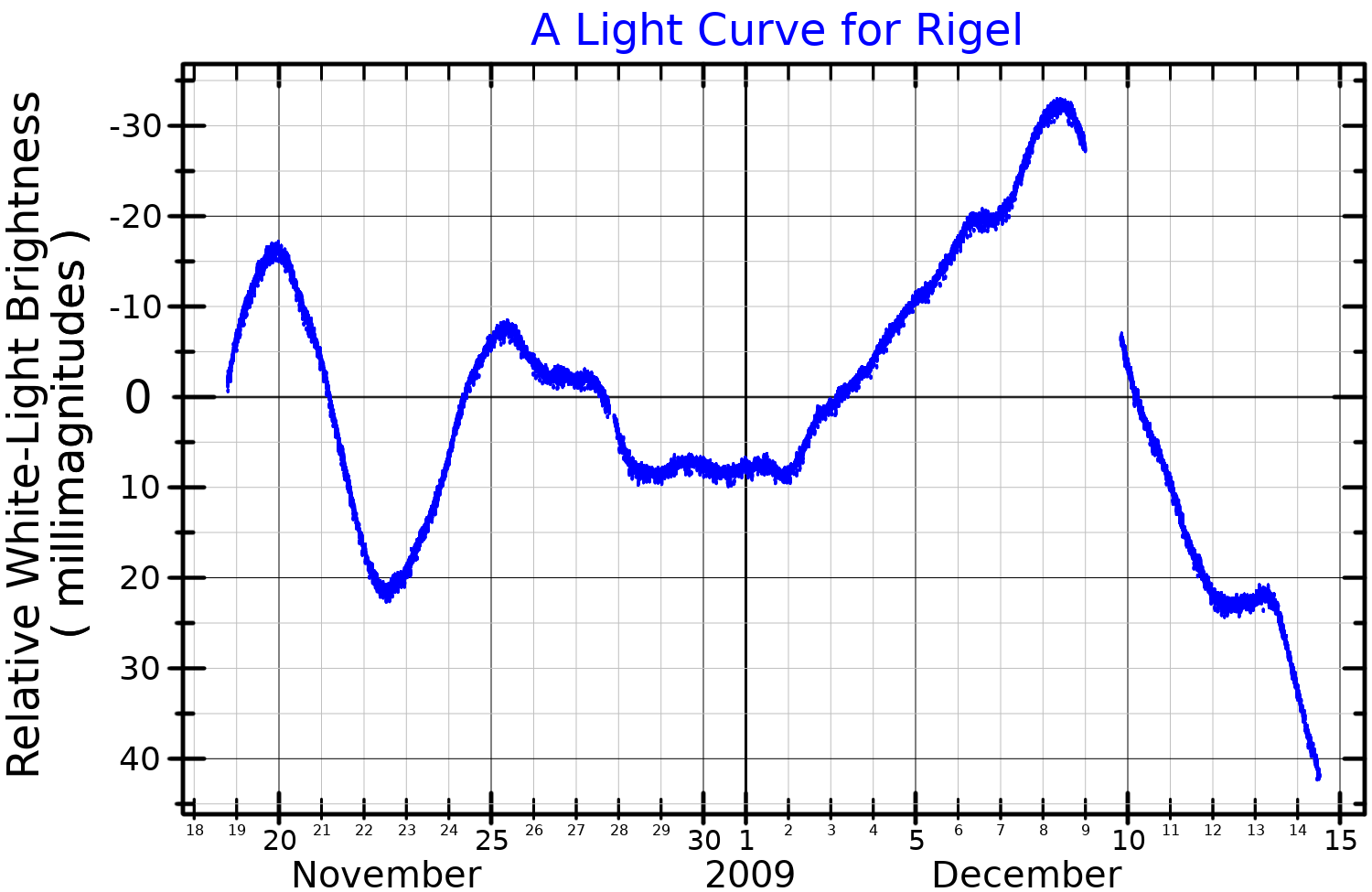
A light curve for Rigel, adapted from Moravveji et al. (2012)

Rigel has been known to vary in brightness since at least 1930. The small amplitude of Rigel's brightness variation requires photoelectric or CCD photometry to be reliably detected. This brightness variation has no obvious period. Observations over 18 nights in 1984 showed variations at red, blue, and yellow wavelengths of up to 0.13 magnitudes on timescales of a few hours to several days, but again no clear period. Rigel's color index varies slightly, but this is not significantly correlated with its brightness variations.

From analysis of Hipparcos satellite photometry, Rigel is identified as belonging to the Alpha Cygni class of variable stars, defined as "non-radially pulsating supergiants of the Bep–AepIa spectral types". In those spectral types, the 'e' indicates that it displays emission lines in its spectrum, while the 'p' means it has an unspecified spectral peculiarity. Alpha Cygni type variables are generally considered to be irregular or have quasi-periods. Rigel was added to the General Catalogue of Variable Stars in the 74th name-list of variable stars on the basis of the Hipparcos photometry, which showed variations with a photographic amplitude of 0.039 magnitudes and a possible period of 2.075 days. Rigel was observed with the Canadian MOST satellite for nearly 28 days in 2009. Millimagnitude variations were observed, and gradual changes in flux suggest the presence of long-period pulsation modes.

=== Mass loss ===
From observations of the variable Hα spectral line, Rigel's mass-loss rate due to stellar wind is estimated to be (1.5±0.4)×10^{−7} solar masses per year (M_{☉}/yr)—about ten million times more than the mass-loss rate from the Sun. More detailed optical and K band infrared spectroscopic observations, together with VLTI interferometry, were taken from 2006 to 2010. Analysis of the Hα and Hγ line profiles, and measurement of the regions producing the lines, show that Rigel's stellar wind varies greatly in structure and strength. Loop and arm structures were also detected within the wind. Calculations of mass loss from the Hγ line give (9.4±0.9)×10^{−7} M_{☉}/yr in 2006-7 and (7.6±1.1)×10^{−7} M_{☉}/yr in 2009–10. Calculations using the Hα line give lower results, around 1.5×10^{−7} M_{☉}/yr. The terminal wind velocity is 300 km/s. It is estimated that Rigel has lost about three solar masses (M_{☉}) since beginning life as a star of 24±3 M_{☉} seven to nine million years ago.

== Distance ==
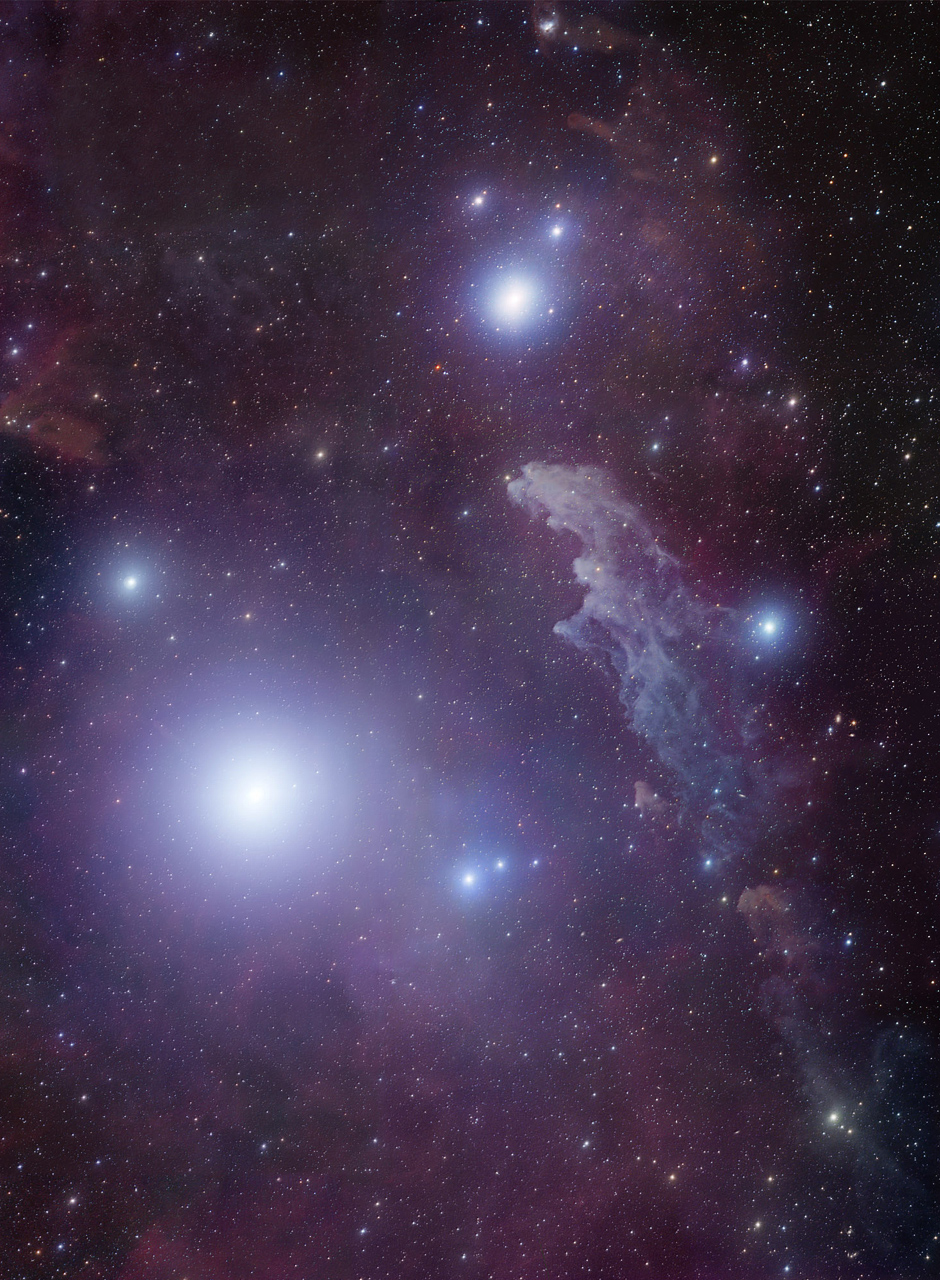
Rigel and reflection nebula IC 2118 in Eridanus. Rigel B is not visible in the glare of the main star.

Rigel's distance from the Sun is somewhat uncertain, different estimates being obtained by different methods. Old estimates placed it 166 parsecs (or 541 light years) away from the Sun. The 2007 Hipparcos new reduction of Rigel's parallax is 3.78±0.34 mas, giving a distance of 863 light-years (265 parsecs) with a margin of error of about 9%. Rigel B, usually considered to be physically associated with Rigel and at the same distance, has a Gaia Data Release 3 parallax of 3.2352±0.0553 mas, suggesting a distance around 1,000 light-years (310 parsecs). However, the measurements for this object may be unreliable.

Indirect distance estimation methods have also been employed. For example, Rigel is believed to be in a region of nebulosity, its radiation illuminating several nearby clouds. Most notable of these is the 5°-long IC 2118 (Witch Head Nebula), located at an angular separation of 2.5° from the star, or a projected distance of 39 light-years (12 parsecs) away. From measures of other nebula-embedded stars, IC 2118's distance is estimated to be 949 ± 7 light-years (291 ± 2 parsecs).

Rigel is an outlying member of the Orion OB1 association, which is located at a distance of up to 1,600 light-years (500 parsecs) from Earth. It is a member of the loosely defined Taurus-Orion R1 Association, somewhat closer at 1,200 light-years (360 parsecs). Rigel is thought to be considerably closer than most of the members of Orion OB1 and the Orion Nebula. Betelgeuse and Saiph lie at a similar distance to Rigel, although Betelgeuse is a runaway star with a complex history and might have originally formed in the main body of the association.

== Stellar system ==
Rigel
Separation = 9.5″ Period = 24,000 y
Ba
Separation = 0.58 mas Period = 9.860 d
Bb
Separation = 0.1″ Period = 63 y
C

Hierarchical scheme for Rigel's components

The star system of which Rigel is a part has at least four components. Rigel (sometimes called Rigel A to distinguish from the other components) has a visual companion, which is likely a close triple-star system. A fainter star at a wider separation might be a fifth component of the Rigel system.

William Herschel discovered Rigel to be a visual double star on 1 October 1781, cataloguing it as star 33 in the "second class of double stars" in his Catalogue of Double Stars, usually abbreviated to H II 33, or as H 2 33 in the Washington Double Star Catalogue. Friedrich Georg Wilhelm von Struve first measured the relative position of the companion in 1822, cataloguing the visual pair as Σ 668. The secondary star is often referred to as Rigel B or β Orionis B. The angular separation of Rigel B from Rigel A is 9.5 arc seconds to its south along position angle 204°. Although not particularly faint at visual magnitude 6.7, the overall difference in brightness from Rigel A (about 6.6 magnitudes or 440 times fainter) makes it a challenging target for telescope apertures smaller than 15 cm (6 in).

At Rigel's estimated distance, Rigel B's projected separation from Rigel A is over 2,200 astronomical units (AU). Since its discovery, there has been no sign of orbital motion, although both stars share a similar common proper motion. The pair would have an estimated orbital period of 24,000 years. Gaia Data Release 3 (DR3) contains a probably unreliable parallax for Rigel B, placing it at about 1,010 light-years (309 parsecs), further away than the Hipparcos distance for Rigel, but similar to the Taurus-Orion R1 association. There is no parallax for Rigel in Gaia DR3. The Gaia DR3 proper motions for Rigel B and the Hipparcos proper motions for Rigel are both small, although not quite the same.

In 1871, Sherburne Wesley Burnham suspected Rigel B to be a binary system, and in 1878, he resolved it into two components. This visual companion is designated as component C (Rigel C), with a measured separation from component B that varies from less than 0.1″ to around 0.3″. In 2009, speckle interferometry showed the two almost identical components separated by 0.124″, with visual magnitudes of 7.5 and 7.6, respectively. Their estimated orbital period is 63 years. Burnham listed the Rigel multiple system as β 555 in his double star catalog or BU 555 in modern use.

Component B is a double-lined spectroscopic binary system, which shows two sets of spectral lines combined within its single stellar spectrum. Periodic changes observed in relative positions of these lines indicate an orbital period of 9.86 days. The two spectroscopic components Rigel Ba and Rigel Bb cannot be resolved in optical telescopes but are known to both be hot stars of spectral type around B9. This spectroscopic binary, together with the close visual component Rigel C, is likely a physical triple-star system, although Rigel C cannot be detected in the spectrum, which is inconsistent with its observed brightness.

In 1878, Burnham found another possibly associated star of approximately 13th magnitude. He listed it as component D of β 555, although it is unclear whether it is physically related or a coincidental alignment. Its 2017 separation from Rigel was 44.5″, almost due north at a position angle of 1°. Gaia DR2 finds it to be a 12th magnitude sunlike star at approximately the same distance as Rigel. Likely a K-type main-sequence star, this star would have an orbital period of around 250,000 years, if it is part of the Rigel system.

A spectroscopic companion to Rigel was reported on the basis of radial velocity variations, and its orbit was even calculated, but subsequent work suggests the star does not exist and that observed pulsations are intrinsic to Rigel itself.

== Physical characteristics ==
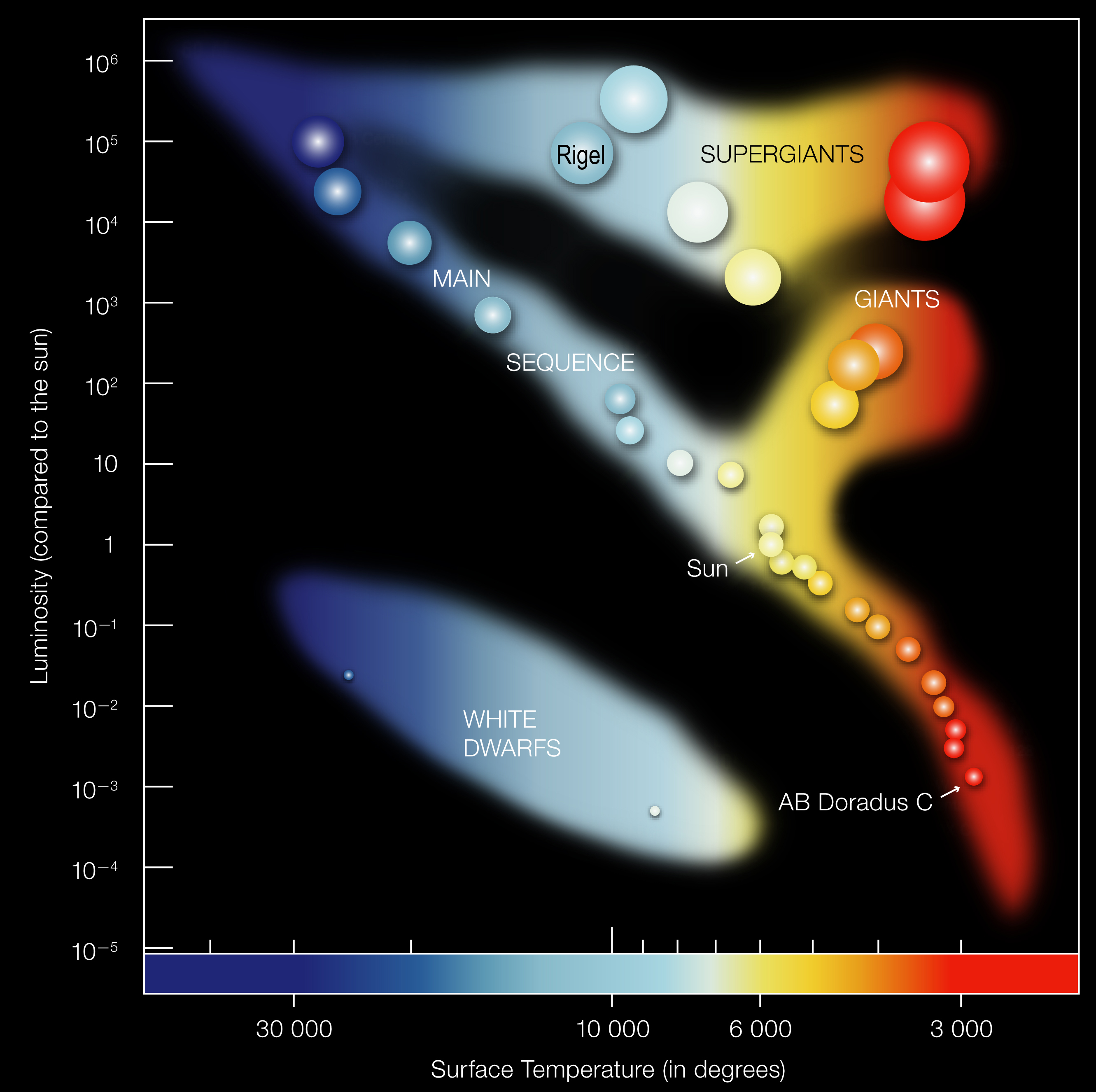
Rigel's place at top-center on the Hertzsprung–Russell diagram

Rigel is a blue supergiant that has exhausted the hydrogen fuel in its core, expanded and cooled as it moved away from the main sequence across the upper part of the Hertzsprung–Russell diagram. When it was on the main sequence, its effective temperature would have been around 30,000 K. Rigel's complex variability at visual wavelengths is caused by stellar pulsations similar to those of Deneb. Further observations of radial velocity variations indicate that it simultaneously oscillates in at least 19 non-radial modes with periods ranging from about 1.2 to 74 days.

Estimation of many physical characteristics of blue supergiant stars, including Rigel, is challenging due to their rarity and uncertainty about how far they are from the Sun. As such, their characteristics are mainly estimated from theoretical stellar evolution models. Its effective temperature can be estimated from the spectral type and color to be around 12,100 K. A mass of 21±3 M_{☉} at an age of 8±1 million years has been estimated by comparing evolutionary tracks, while atmospheric modeling from the spectrum gives a mass of 24±8 M_{☉}.

Although Rigel is often considered the most luminous star within 1,000 light-years of the Sun, its energy output is poorly known. Using the Hipparcos distance of 860 light-years (264 parsecs), the estimated relative luminosity for Rigel is about 120,000 times that of the Sun (L_{☉}), but another distance of 1,170 ± 130 light-years (360 ± 40 parsecs) suggests an even higher luminosity of 219,000 L_{☉}. Other calculations based on theoretical stellar evolutionary models of Rigel's atmosphere give luminosities anywhere between 83,000 L_{☉} and 363,000 L_{☉}, while summing the spectral energy distribution from historical photometry with the Hipparcos distance suggests a luminosity as low as 61,515±11,486 L_{☉}. A 2018 study using the Navy Precision Optical Interferometer measured the angular diameter as 2.526 mas. After correcting for limb darkening, the angular diameter is found to be 2.606±0.009 mas, yielding a radius of 74.1+6.1
−7.3 R_{☉}. An older measurement of the angular diameter gives 2.75±0.01 mas, equivalent to a radius of 78.9 R_{☉} at 264 pc. These radii are calculated assuming the Hipparcos distance of 264 pc; adopting a distance of 360 pc leads to a significantly larger size. Older distance estimates were mostly far lower than modern estimates, leading to lower radius estimates; a 1922 estimate by John Stanley Plaskett gave Rigel a diameter of 25 million miles, or approximately 28.9 R_{☉}, smaller than its neighbor Aldebaran.

Due to their closeness to each other and ambiguity of the spectrum, little is known about the intrinsic properties of the members of the Rigel BC triple system. All three stars seem to be near equally hot B-type main-sequence stars that are three to four times as massive as the Sun.

== Evolution ==
Stellar evolution models suggest the pulsations of Rigel are powered by nuclear reactions in a hydrogen-burning shell that is at least partially non-convective. These pulsations are stronger and more numerous in stars that have evolved through a red supergiant phase and then increased in temperature to again become a blue supergiant. This is due to the decreased mass and increased levels of fusion products at the surface of the star.

Rigel is likely to be fusing helium in its core. Due to strong convection of helium produced in the core while Rigel was on the main sequence and in the hydrogen-burning shell since it became a supergiant, the fraction of helium at the surface has increased from 26.6% when the star formed to 32% now. The surface abundances of carbon, nitrogen, and oxygen seen in the spectrum are compatible with a post-red supergiant star only if its internal convection zones are modeled using non-homogeneous chemical conditions known as the Ledoux Criteria.

Rigel is expected to eventually end its stellar life as a Type II supernova. It is one of the closest known potential supernova progenitors to Earth, and would be expected to have a maximum apparent magnitude of around −11 (about the same brightness as a quarter Moon or around 300 times brighter than Venus ever gets). The supernova would leave behind either a black hole or a neutron star.

== Etymology and cultural significance ==
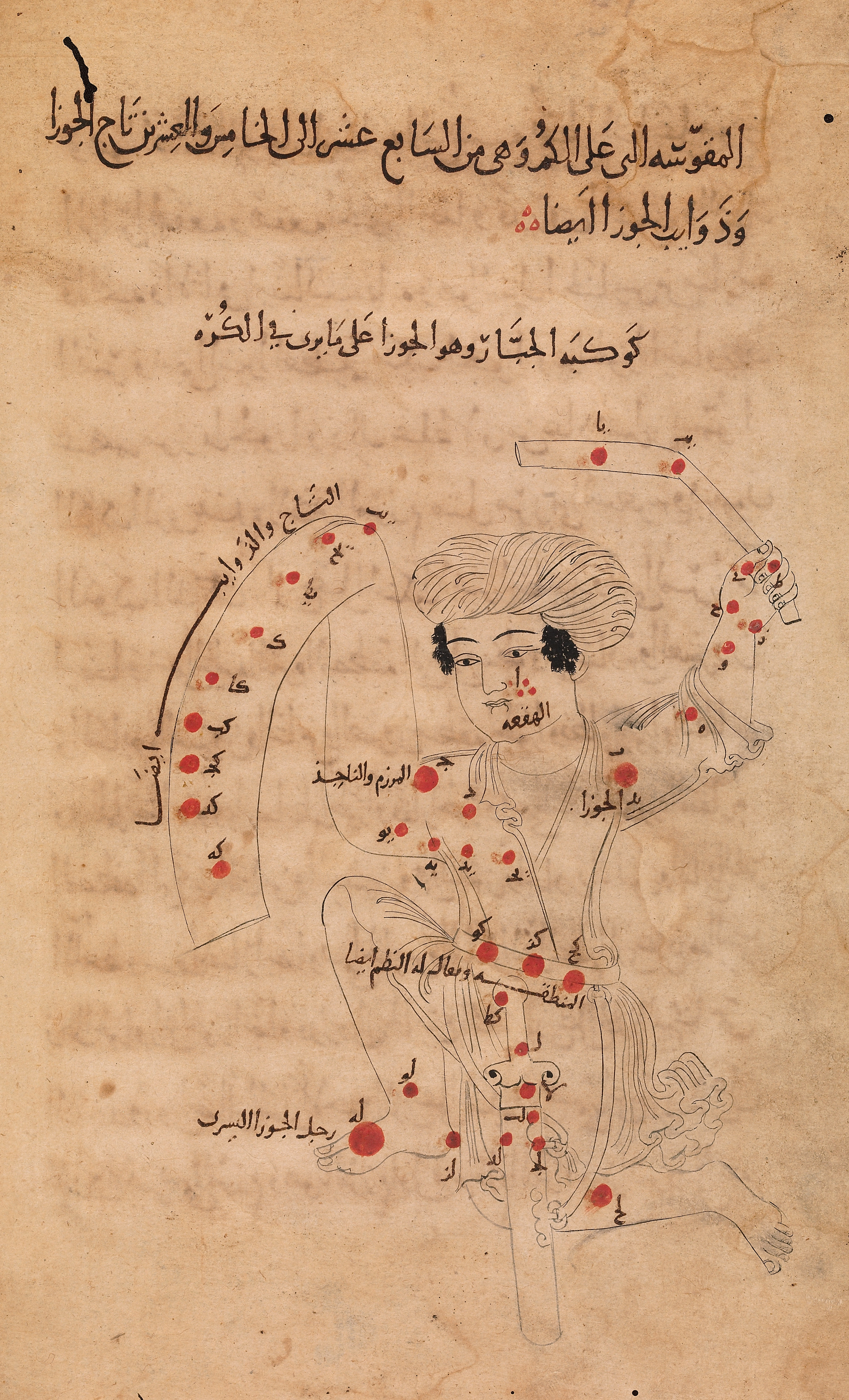
Orion illustrated in a copy of Abd al-Rahman al-Sufi's Book of Fixed Stars. The foot on the left is annotated rijl al-jauza al-yusra, the Arabic name from which Rigel is derived. (Note: Al-Sufi's book was translated into Latin and other European languages. Al-Sufi himself planned the figures, two for each constellation: one shows how they appear to an observer looking up toward the heavens; the other how they appear to the observer looking down upon a celestial globe.)

The earliest known recording of the name Rigel is in the Alfonsine tables of 1521. It is derived from the Arabic name Rijl Jauzah al Yusrā, "the left leg (foot) of Jauzah" (i.e. rijl meaning "leg, foot"), which can be traced to the 10th century. "Jauzah" was a proper name for Orion; an alternative Arabic name was رجل الجبار rijl al-jabbār, "the foot of the great one", from which stems the rarely used variant names Algebar or Elgebar. The Alphonsine tables saw its name split into "Rigel" and "Algebar", with the note, et dicitur Algebar. Nominatur etiam Rigel. (Note: lit."... and it is called Algebar. It is also named Rigel.") Alternate spellings from the 17th century include Regel by Italian astronomer Giovanni Battista Riccioli, Riglon by German astronomer Wilhelm Schickard, and Rigel Algeuze or Algibbar by English scholar Edmund Chilmead.

With the constellation representing the mythological Greek huntsman Orion, Rigel is his knee or (as its name suggests) foot; with the nearby star Beta Eridani marking Orion's footstool. Rigel is presumably the star known as "Aurvandil's toe" in Norse mythology. In the Caribbean, Rigel represented the severed leg of the folkloric figure Trois Rois, himself represented by the three stars of Orion's Belt. The leg had been severed with a cutlass by the maiden Bįhi (Sirius). The Lacandon people of southern Mexico knew it as tunsel ("little woodpecker").

Rigel was known as Yerrerdet-kurrk to the Wotjobaluk koori of southeastern Australia, and held to be the mother-in-law of Totyerguil (Altair). The distance between them signified the taboo preventing a man from approaching his mother-in-law. The indigenous Boorong people of northwestern Victoria named Rigel as Collowgullouric Warepil. The Wardaman people of northern Australia know Rigel as the Red Kangaroo Leader Unumburrgu and chief conductor of ceremonies in a songline when Orion is high in the sky. Eridanus, the river, marks a line of stars in the sky leading to it, and the other stars of Orion are his ceremonial tools and entourage. Betelgeuse is Ya-jungin "Owl Eyes Flicking", watching the ceremonies.

The Māori people of New Zealand named Rigel as Puanga, said to be a daughter of Rehua (Antares), the chief of all stars. Its heliacal rising presages the appearance of Matariki (the Pleiades) in the dawn sky, marking the Māori New Year in late May or early June. The Moriori people of the Chatham Islands, as well as some Maori groups in New Zealand, mark the start of their New Year with Rigel rather than the Pleiades. Puaka is a southern name variant used in the South Island.

In Japan, the Minamoto or Genji clan chose Rigel and its white color as its symbol, calling the star Genji-boshi (源氏星), while the Taira or Heike clan adopted Betelgeuse and its red color. The two powerful families fought the Genpei War; the stars were seen as facing off against each other and kept apart only by the three stars of Orion's Belt.

== In modern culture ==
The MS Rigel was originally a Norwegian ship, built in Copenhagen in 1924. It was requisitioned by the Germans during World War II and sunk in 1944 while being used to transport prisoners of war. Two US Navy ships have borne the name USS Rigel. The SSM-N-6 Rigel was a cruise missile program for the US Navy that was cancelled in 1953 before reaching deployment.

The Rigel Skerries are a chain of small islands in Antarctica, renamed after originally being called Utskjera. They were given their current name as Rigel was used as an astrofix. Mount Rigel, elevation 1,910 m (6,270 ft), is also in Antarctica.

== See also ==
- Orion in Chinese astronomy
