= Rigel Skerries =

Chain of islands and rocks in Antarctica

Rigel Skerries (66°55′S 57°18′E) is a chain of islands and rocks in the northwest part of the Oygarden Group, lying in the south part of the entrance to Edward VIII Bay in Antarctica. Mapped by Norwegian cartographers from aerial photos taken by the Lars Christensen Expedition, 1936–37, and called Utskjera (the outer skerries). The group was first visited by an ANARE (Australian National Antarctic Research Expeditions) party in 1954; these skerries were renamed by Antarctic Names Committee of Australia (ANCA) after the star Rigel which was used for an astrofix in the vicinity.
