= Index Catalogue of Visual Double Stars =

Star catalogue

The Index Catalogue of Visual Double Stars, or IDS, is a catalog of double stars. It was published by Lick Observatory in 1963 and contains measurements for 64,250 objects, covering the entire sky. The database used to construct this catalog was later transferred from Lick Observatory to the United States Naval Observatory, where it became the basis for the Washington Double Star Catalog.

== See also ==
- Aitken Double Star Catalogue
- Burnham Double Star Catalogue
