= NGC 1234 =

Galaxy in the constellation Eridanus

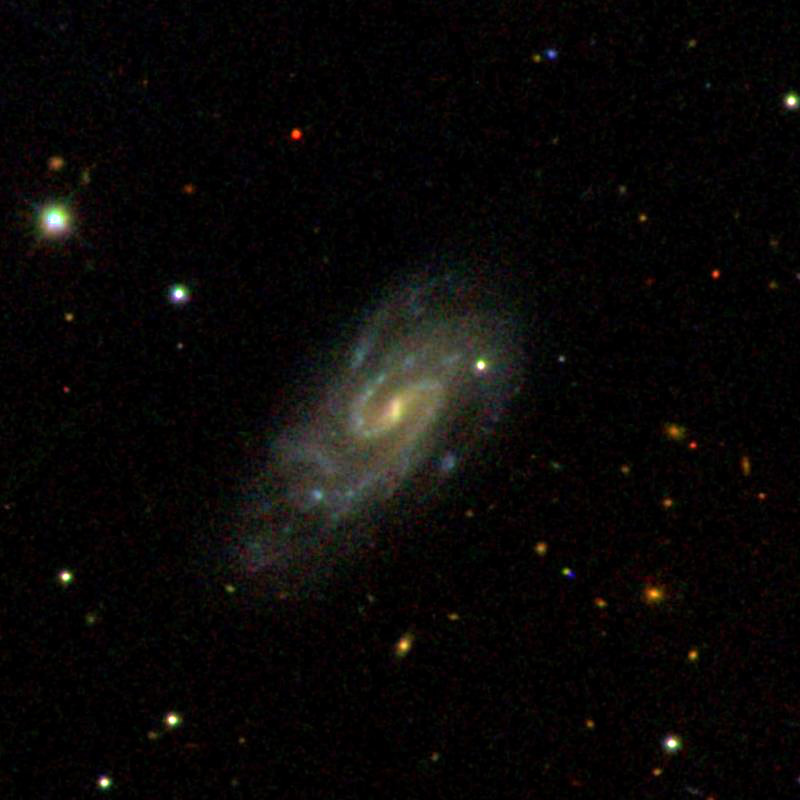
- NGC 1234 imaged by SDSS

Observation data (J2000.0 epoch)
- Constellation: Eridanus
- Right ascension: 3^{h} 9^{m} 39.1^{s}
- Declination: −7° 50′ 47″
- Redshift: 3731 ± 3 km/s
- Apparent magnitude (V): 15.3

Characteristics
- Type: SB(r)cd pec
- Apparent size (V): 1′24 × 0.63′

Other designations
- PGC 11813, MCG -01-09-011

NGC 1234 is a peculiar barred spiral galaxy exhibiting a ring structure in the constellation Eridanus, discovered by Francis Preserved Leavenworth in 1886.
