= Lambda Eridani variable =

Type of variable star

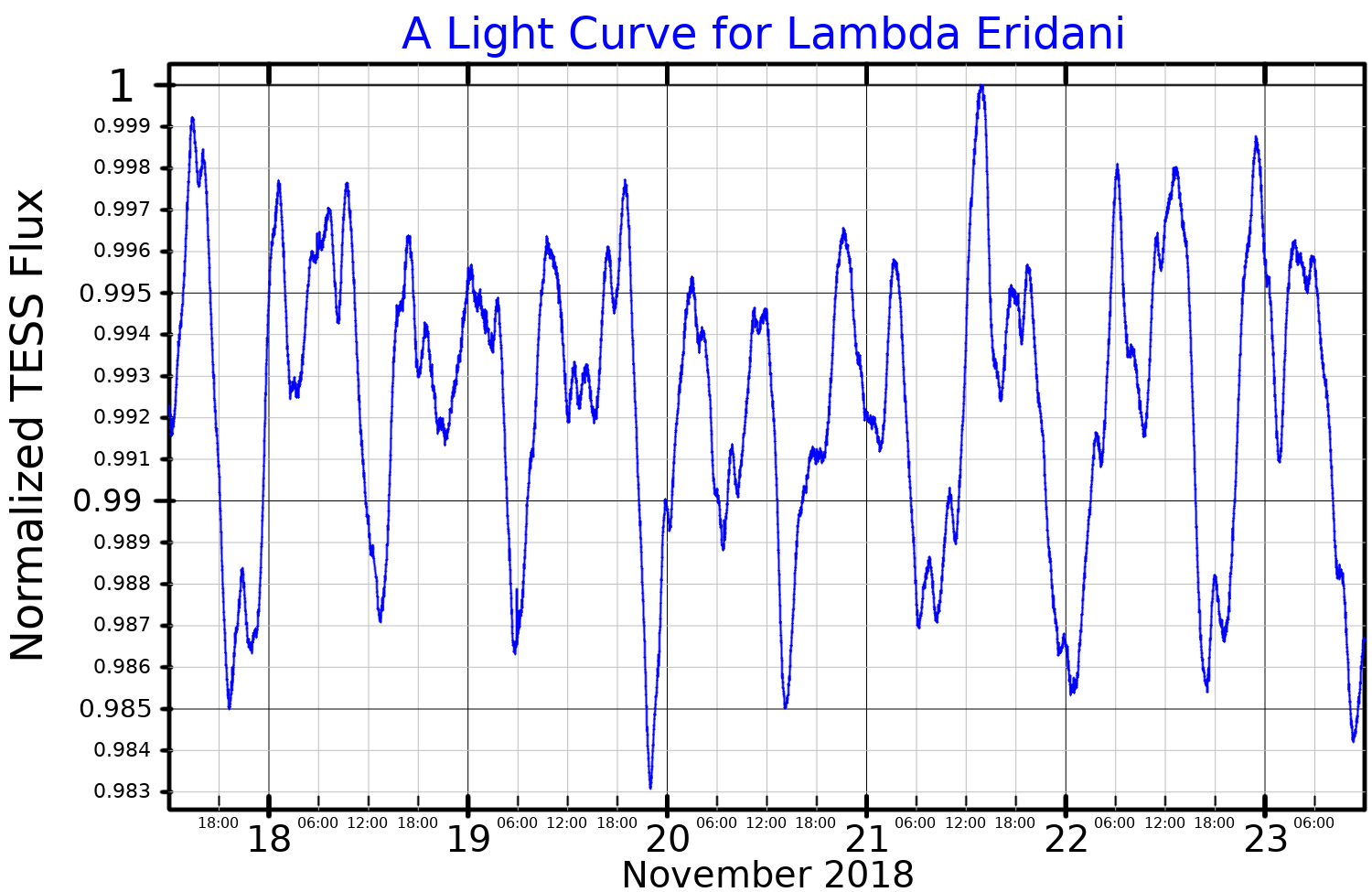
Light curve of Lambda Eridani, the prototype star of the class

A Lambda Eridani Variable is a class of Be stars that show small amplitude variations of a few hundredths of a magnitude. The variations are highly regular with periods between 0.5 and 2.0 days, and they were initially described as periodic Be stars. Lambda Eridani is an example and the prototype. This has been ascribed to non-radial pulsations, inhomogeneous rotating discs, or the rotation of the star itself.

These stars are rarely classified, or are classified incorrectly. The General Catalogue of Variable Stars does not have a type for λ Eridani variables, only GCAS for Gamma Cassiopeiae variables and BE for non-GCAS Be star variables. λ Eridani itself is incorrectly listed as a Beta Cephei variable. The AAVSO International Variable Star Index defines a LERI type of variability, with 51 stars included as λ Eri variables, 16 of them only suspected, and 32 combined with other types of variation.
