= Winter Hexagon =

Astronomical asterism

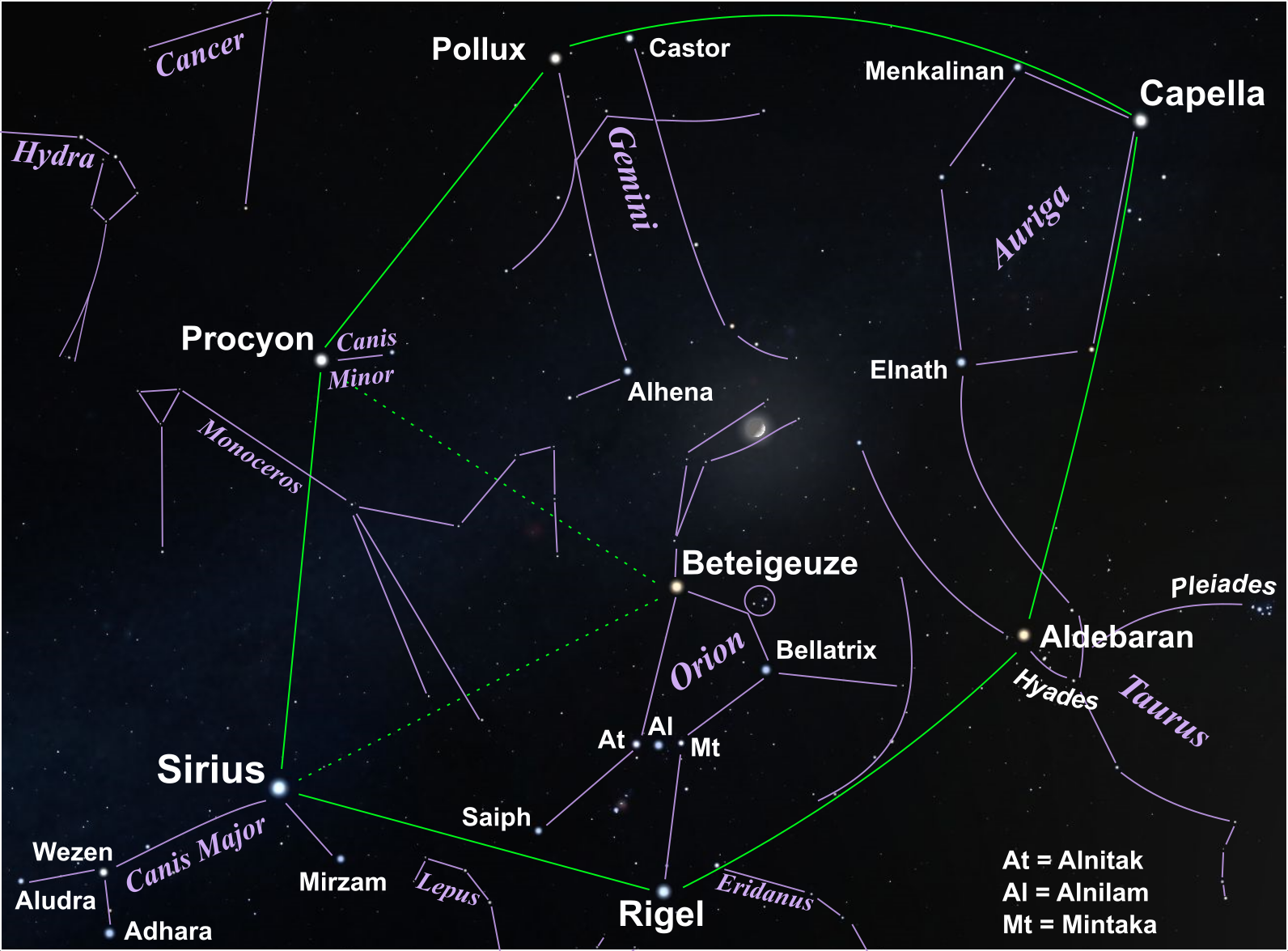
The Winter Hexagon and the Winter Triangle (dashed) with stars of an apparent magnitude of at least 2 mag labelled

The Winter Hexagon is an asterism appearing in the form of a large irregular hexagon with vertices at Rigel, Aldebaran, Capella, Pollux, Procyon, and Sirius. It lies predominantly in the northern celestial hemisphere.

Using Orion to find stars in its neighboring constellations

Near the equator, the asterism is visible in the evening sky from approximately December to June, and in the morning sky from July to late November. With increasing latitude, its visibility becomes progressively more restricted, as the stars remain lower above the horizon and are observable for shorter portions of the night. In the tropics and the southern hemisphere, where it appears during the local summer, this asterism (then called the "summer hexagon") can be extended southward with the bright star Canopus.

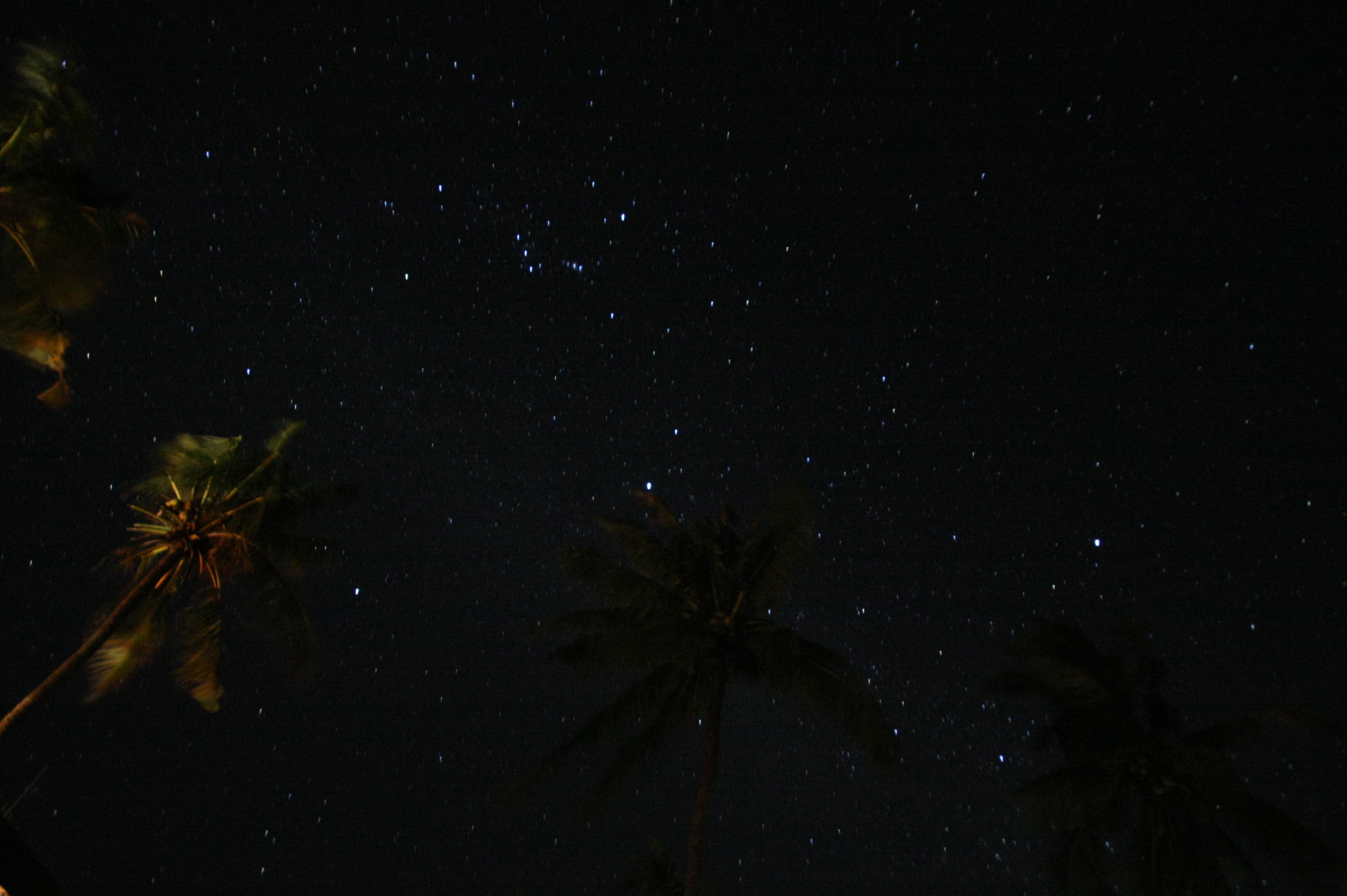
Winter constellations as seen from the tropics

The asterism encompasses the Winter Triangle, an approximately equilateral triangle that shares two vertices (Sirius and Procyon) with the Winter Hexagon. The third vertex is Betelgeuse, which lies near the center of the hexagon. These three stars are three of the ten brightest objects, as viewed from Earth, outside the Solar System. Betelgeuse is also particularly easy to locate, being a shoulder of Orion, which assists stargazers in finding the triangle. The triangle can be used to find the larger hexagon.

The stars in the hexagon are parts of six constellations. Counter-clockwise around the hexagon, starting with Rigel, these are Orion, Taurus, Auriga, Gemini, Canis Minor, and Canis Major. Several of the stars in the hexagon can also be found independently by following various lines traced through the stars in Orion.

== See also ==
- Spring Triangle
- Summer Triangle
- Northern Cross
