= Burnham Double Star Catalogue =

Star catalogue

The Burnham Double Star Catalogue (BDS) is a catalogue of double stars within 121° of the celestial North Pole. It was published in two parts by the Carnegie Institution of Washington in 1906, under the title A General Catalogue of Double Stars Within 121° of the North Pole. The first part gives coordinates, designations, and magnitudes for 13,665 pairs of double stars, comprising almost all double stars discovered before 1906. The second part contains measures, notes, and references to publications for each pair. Its publication was a stimulus to double star observation.

The BDS was compiled by Sherburne Wesley Burnham, who worked on it sporadically for 36 years, starting in 1870. He first submitted it to the Smithsonian Institution, but it was rejected. In 1874, it was scheduled to be printed at the United States Naval Observatory, but the typesetting was interrupted midway and the type destroyed. In 1886 the Smithsonian changed its mind and offered to publish it, but Burnham had become discouraged and did not accept the offer. Burnham worked at Lick Observatory for four years starting in 1888. After leaving in 1892, he revised the manuscript of his catalog for five years; the Carnegie Institute published it nine years later.

By the time Burnham retired from Yerkes Observatory, he had accumulated material for a revision of his catalogue. This eventually formed part of the 1932 Aitken Double Star Catalogue (ADS), the successor to the BDS.

== See also ==
- Index Catalogue of Visual Double Stars
- Washington Double Star Catalog
