= Washington Double Star Catalog =

Astronomical catalog

- Alternative names: WDS

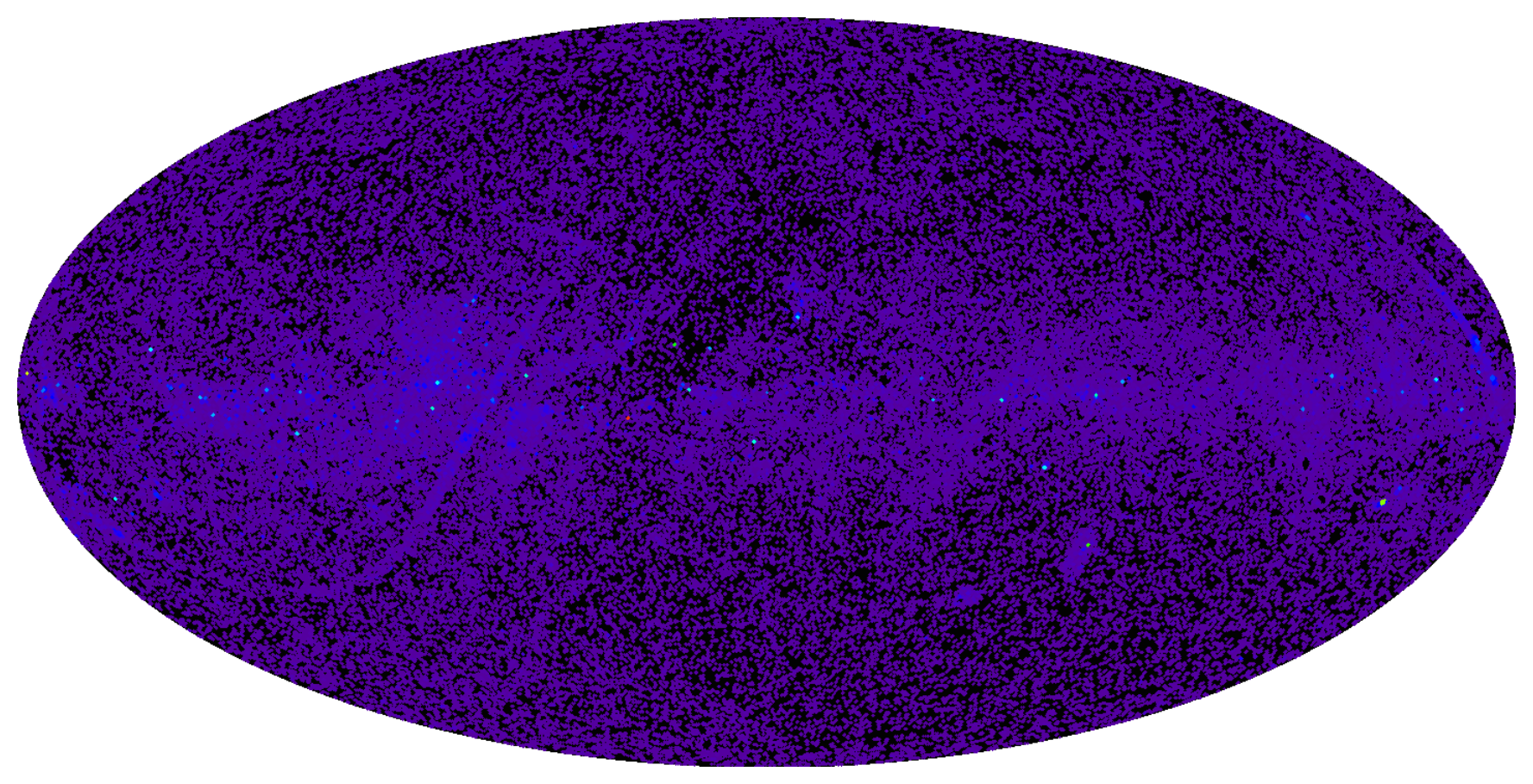
The distribution of the objects of the catalog over the firmament is fairly even.

The Washington Double Star Catalog, or WDS, is a catalog of double stars, maintained at the United States Naval Observatory. The catalog contains positions, magnitudes, proper motions and spectral types and has entries for (as of January 2024) 157,012 pairs of double stars. The catalog also includes multiple stars. In general, a multiple star with n components will be represented by entries in the catalog for n−1 pairs of stars.

== History ==
The database used to construct the WDS originated at Lick Observatory, where it was used to construct the Index Catalog of Visual Double Stars, published in 1963. In 1965, under the initiative of Charles Worley, it was transferred to the Naval Observatory.

The catalog has since been augmented by many measurements, mainly from the Hipparcos and Tycho catalogues and results from speckle interferometry, as well as other sources. A unique 1–3 letter discovery code is used to identify the observer who reported the information. For example, HEI is used for the German astronomer W. D. Heintz.

== See also ==
- Aitken Double Star Catalogue
- Burnham Double Star Catalogue
