= Psi Eridani =

Star in the constellation Eridanus

ψ Eridani
- Location of ψ Eridani (circled in red)

Observation data Epoch J2000.0 Equinox J2000.0 (ICRS)
- Constellation: Eridanus
- Right ascension: 05^{h} 01^{m} 26.34578^{s}
- Declination: −07° 10′ 26.2732″
- Apparent magnitude (V): 4.81

Characteristics
- Evolutionary stage: Main sequence
- Spectral type: B3 V or B3 IV
- U−B color index: −0.75
- B−V color index: −0.19

Astrometry
Radial velocity (R_{v})	20.7±1.1 km/s
Proper motion (μ)	RA: +1.315 mas/yr Dec.: +7.002 mas/yr
Parallax (π)	3.5964±0.1432 mas
Distance	910 ± 40 ly (280 ± 10 pc)
Absolute magnitude (M_{V})	−1.97

Details
Mass	6.875+0.130 −0.122 M_{☉}
Radius	6.63+0.22 −0.27 R_{☉}
Luminosity	3,329+171 −232 L_{☉}
Surface gravity (log g)	3.55±0.02 cgs
Temperature	17,025+51 −52 K
Rotational velocity (v sin i)	52±8 km/s
Age	31.6±0.6 Myr

Other designations
- ψ Eri, BD−07°948, 65 Eridani, HD 32249, HIP 23364, HR 1617, SAO 131700

Database references
SIMBAD	data

Psi Eridani is a star in the constellation Eridanus. Its name is a Bayer designation that is Latinized from ψ Eridani, and abbreviated Psi Eri or ψ Eri. With an apparent visual magnitude is 4.81, it can be seen with the naked eye on a clear, dark night. Based upon an annual parallax shift of 4.41 milliarcseconds, it is located roughly 740 light-years distant.

This is a B-type main-sequence star with a stellar classification of B3 V. The main sequence class is further supported by stellar evolution models. It is about 32 million years old and has a projected rotational velocity of 52 km/s. The star has 6.9 times the mass of the Sun and 6.63 times the Sun's radius. Psi Eridani shines with 3,329 times the solar luminosity from its outer atmosphere at an effective temperature of 17,025 K.
