= Lambda Eridani =

Variable star in the constellation Eridanus

λ Eridani
- Location of λ Eridani (circled in red)

Observation data Epoch J2000.0 Equinox J2000.0 (ICRS)
- Constellation: Eridanus
- Right ascension: 05^{h} 09^{m} 08.78315^{s}
- Declination: −08° 45′ 14.6908″
- Apparent magnitude (V): 4.27

Characteristics
- Spectral type: B2 IVne or B2 III(e)p
- U−B color index: −0.90
- B−V color index: −0.19
- Variable type: λ Eri

Astrometry
Radial velocity (R_{v})	−2.51±5.43 km/s
Proper motion (μ)	RA: +0.25 mas/yr Dec.: −1.97 mas/yr
Parallax (π)	4.02±0.18 mas
Distance	810 ± 40 ly (250 ± 10 pc)
Absolute magnitude (M_{V})	−3.75

Details
Mass	9.2 M_{☉}
Radius	7.31 R_{☉}
Luminosity	14,689 L_{☉}
Surface gravity (log g)	4.32 cgs
Temperature	22,362 K
Metallicity [Fe/H]	−2.0 dex
Rotation	1.40346 d
Rotational velocity (v sin i)	318 km/s
Age	21.0 Myr

Other designations
- λ Eridani, 69 Eridani, BD−08°1040, FK5 190, HD 33328, HIP 23972, HR 1679, SAO 131824

Database references
SIMBAD	data

Lambda Eridani (λ Eri) is a star in the constellation Eridanus. It is visible to the naked eye on a dark night with an apparent visual magnitude of 4.27. The distance to this star, based upon an annual parallax shift of 0.00402 arcseconds, is roughly 810 light years.

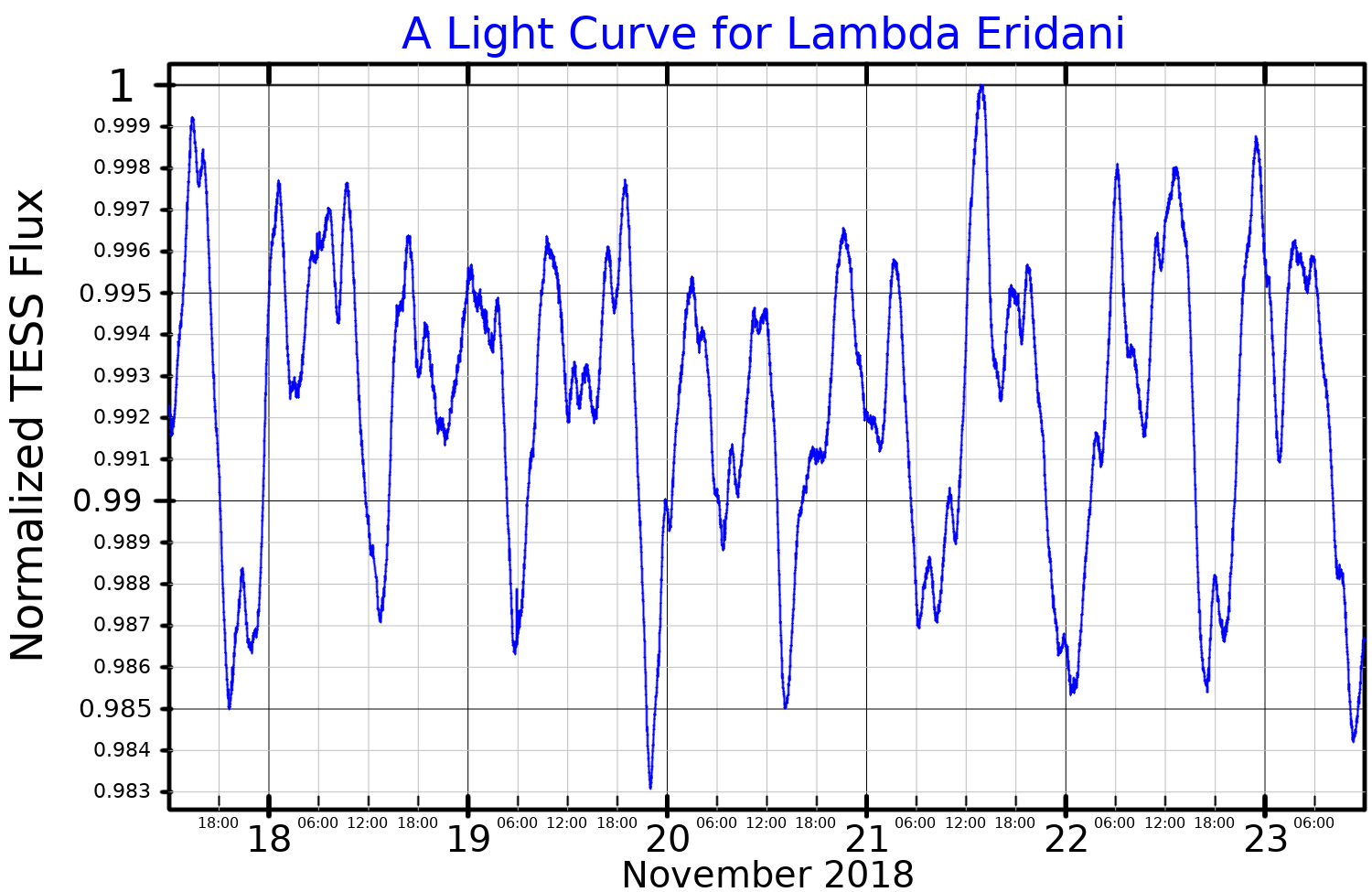
A light curve for Lambda Eridani, plotted from TESS data

λ Eri is classified in the General Catalogue of Variable Stars as a Beta Cephei variable. The AAVSO International Variable Star Index defines a LERI type of variation. λ Eri is classified as LERI + GCAS since it shows both short term periodic variations and longer timescale eruptive variation. It was one of the first stars where short-period variations were found. The line profile variability periods are 0.702d and 0.269d, with intermittently present periods of 0.6d and 0.75d. The photometric amplitude of the variation is 0.010 magnitude.

This is a giant or subgiant Be star with a stellar classification of B2 IVne or B2 III(e)p, depending on the source. It is spinning rapidly with a projected rotational velocity of 327 km/s. Compare this to the estimated break-up velocity of 440 km/s. This rotation is giving the star an oblate shape with an equatorial bulge that is 25% larger than the polar radius. The most likely rotation period is deemed to be twice the period of variation, or 1.4 days. The star also possesses a rotating circumstellar disc, seen edge on, which makes Lambda Eri a "shell star", where the disk appears more opaque than usual.

Like most Be stars, Lambda Eridani emits soft X-rays. In 1993, a giant X-ray flare was observed in which the X-ray luminosity increased by a factor of six over a 39-hour period. Lambda Eridani has about nine times the mass of the Sun, and seven times the Sun's radius. It radiates 14,700 times the solar luminosity from its outer atmosphere at an effective temperature of 22,362 K.
