= NGC 1788 =

Reflection nebula in Orion

Reflection nebula
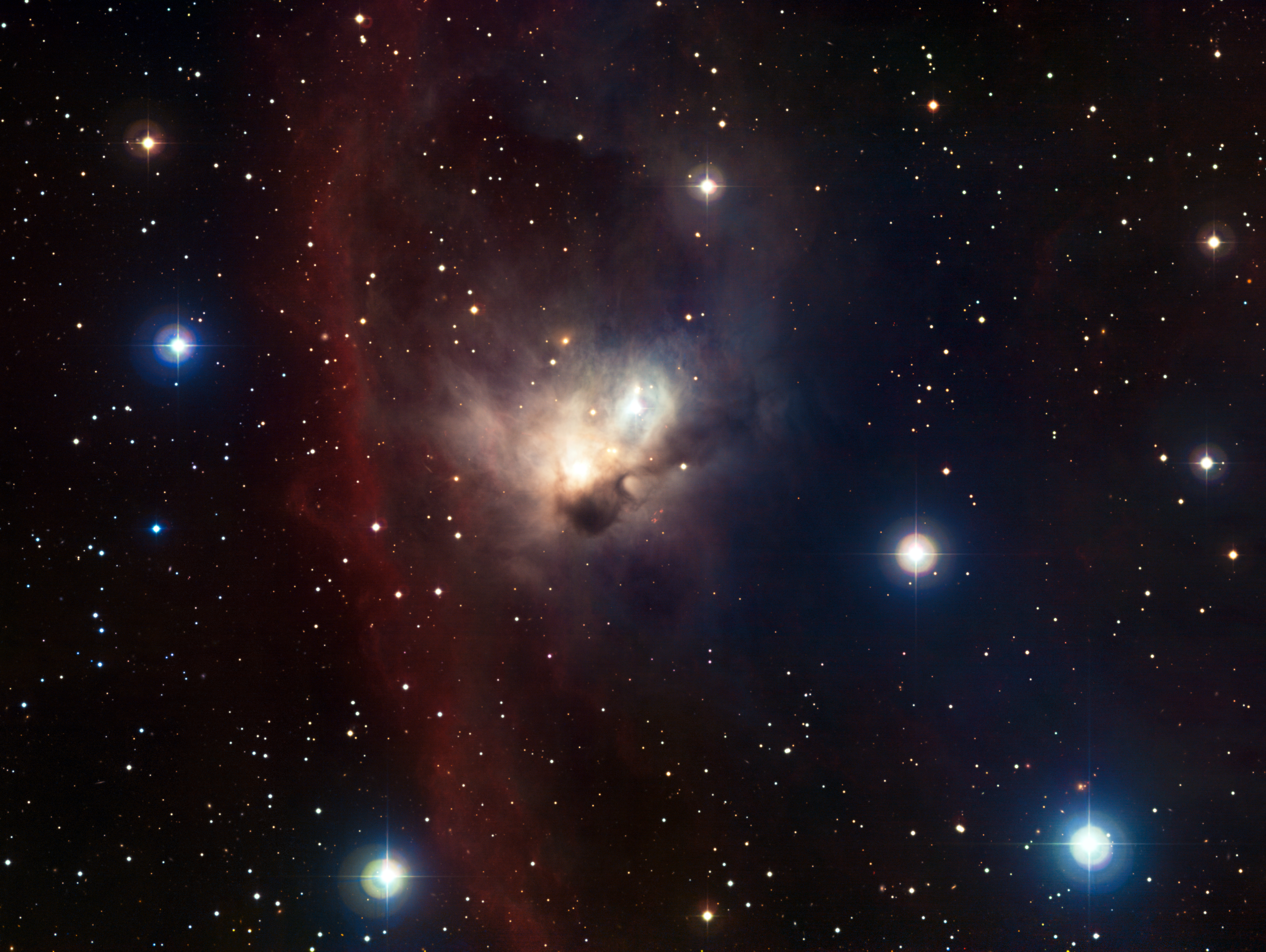
- NGC 1788 is located in a dark and often neglected corner of the Orion constellation. This image has been obtained using the Wide Field Imager on the MPG/ESO 2.2-metre telescope at ESO's La Silla Observatory.

Observation data: J2000 epoch
- Right ascension: 05^{h} 06^{m} 54^{s}
- Declination: −03° 21′ 00″
- Distance: 1,300 ly (400 pc) ly
- Apparent magnitude (V): 9.0
- Apparent dimensions (V): 5′ × 3′
- Constellation: Orion

NGC 1788, also known as the Cosmic Bat Nebula or Foxface Nebula, is a reflection nebula in the constellation of Orion. It is rather sharply defined on its southwest perimeter where it is flanked by the dark nebula known as LDN 1616 (or Lynds 1616). LDN 1616 is apparently part of NGC 1788. The brightest involved star is 10th magnitude and lies in the northwest sector.

== Gallery ==
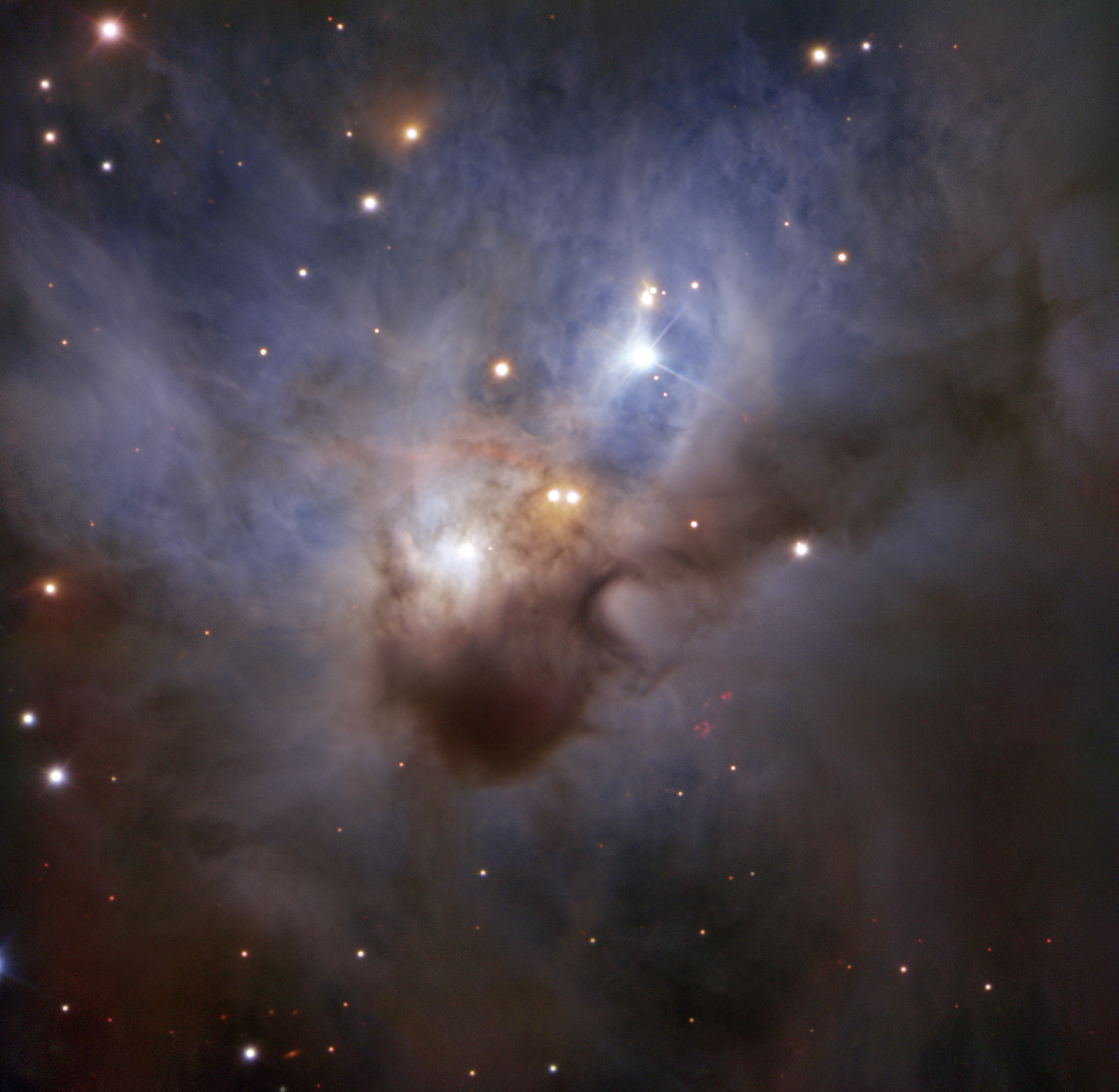
NGC 1788 taken by the VLT's FORS2 instrument.
