= Aitken Double Star Catalogue =

Star catalogue

The Aitken Double Star Catalogue, or ADS, is a star catalogue of double stars. It was compiled by Robert Grant Aitken and published in 1932 in two volumes, under the name New general catalogue of double stars within 120° of the North Pole. It contains measurements of 17,180 double stars north of declination −30°. Entries in this catalogue are generally referred to by an index number prefixed with the letters ADS.

The catalog was a successor to the Burnham Double Star Catalogue and was based on observations compiled by Sherburne Wesley Burnham from 1906 to 1912, and by Eric Doolittle from 1912 to 1919. Aitken began work on the catalog shortly after Doolittle's death in 1920. The catalog contains observations made up to 1927.

== See also ==
- Index Catalogue of Visual Double Stars
- Washington Double Star Catalog
