= IC 2118 =

Reflection nebula in the constellation Eridanus

Reflection nebula
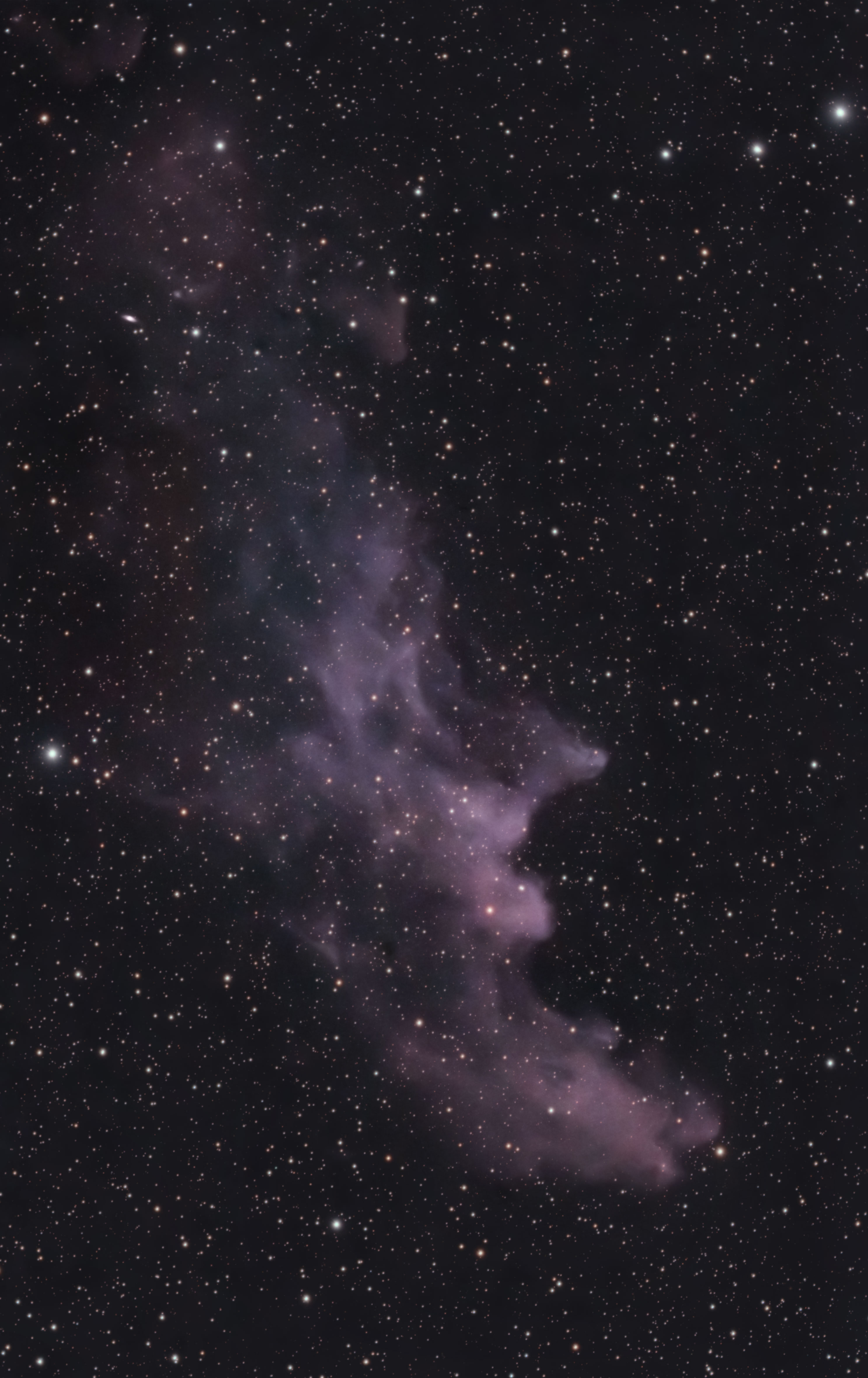
- IC 2118

Observation data: J2000 epoch
- Right ascension: 05^{h} 02^{m} 00.0^{s}
- Declination: −07° 54′ 00″
- Distance: 1,000 ly
- Apparent magnitude (V): 13
- Apparent dimensions (V): 3 × 1°
- Constellation: Eridanus
- Designations: Witch Head Nebula, Cederblad 41, NGC 1909

IC 2118 (also known as Witch Head Nebula due to its shape) is an extremely faint reflection nebula believed to be an ancient supernova remnant or gas cloud illuminated by nearby supergiant star Rigel in the constellation of Orion. The nebula lies in the constellation Eridanus, about 900 light-years from Earth. The nature of the dust particles, reflecting blue light better than red, is a factor in giving the Witch Head its blue color. Radio observations show substantial carbon monoxide emission throughout parts of IC 2118, an indicator of the presence of molecular clouds and star formation in the nebula. In fact candidates for pre-main sequence stars and some classic T Tauri stars have been found deep within the nebula.

The molecular clouds of IC 2118 are probably juxtaposed to the outer boundaries of the vast Orion-Eridanus bubble, a giant supershell of molecular hydrogen blown by the high mass stars of the Orion OB1 association. As the supershell expands into the interstellar medium, favorable circumstances for star formation occur. IC 2118 is located in one such area. The wind blown appearance and cometary shape of the bright reflection nebula is highly suggestive of a strong association with the high mass luminous stars of Orion OB1. The fact that the heads of the cometary clouds of IC2118 point northeast towards the association is strong support of that relationship.

== See also ==
- New General Catalogue#Index Catalogue, IC is acronym for Index Catalogue
