= Eridanus =

Constellation in the southern hemisphere

- Constellation
- List of stars in Eridanus
- Abbreviation: Eri
- Genitive: Eridani
- Pronunciation: /ɪˈrɪdənəs/ Erídanus, genitive /ɪˈrɪdənaɪ/
- Symbolism: the river Eridanus
- Right ascension: 3.25^{h}
- Declination: −29°
- Quadrant: SQ1
- Area: 1138 sq. deg. (6th)
- Main stars: 24
- Bayer/Flamsteed stars: 87
- Stars brighter than 3.00^{m}: 4
- Stars within 10.00 pc (32.62 ly): 13
- Brightest star: Achernar (α Eri) (0.46^{m})
- Nearest star: ε Eri (Ran)
- Messier objects: 0
- Meteor showers: 0
- Bordering constellations: Cetus; Fornax; Phoenix; Hydrus; Tucana (corner); Horologium; Caelum; Lepus; Orion; Taurus
- Visible at latitudes between +32° and −90°. Best visible at 21:00 (9 p.m.) during the month of December.

Eridanus is a constellation which stretches along the southern celestial hemisphere. It is represented as a river. One of the 48 constellations listed by the 2nd century AD astronomer Ptolemy, it remains one of the 88 modern constellations. It is the sixth largest of the modern constellations. The same name was later taken as a Latin name for the real Po River and also for the name of a minor river in Athens.

== Features ==
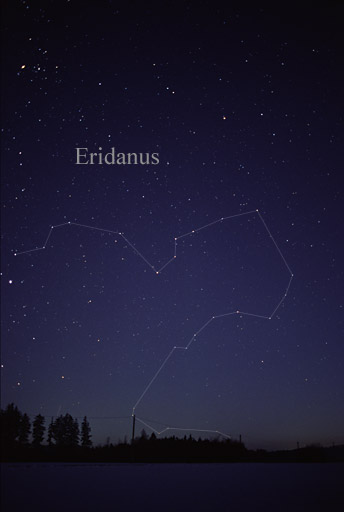
The constellation of Eridanus, the river, as seen by the naked eye from northern latitudes.

The constellation Eridanus showing the IAU boundaries, the constellation stick figure, and labels for its brightest stars. Astrophotograph by Eckhard Slawik, from NOIRLab's 88 Constellations project.

=== Stars ===
At its southern end is the magnitude 0.5 star Achernar, designated Alpha Eridani. It is a blue-white hued main sequence star 144 light-years from Earth, whose traditional name means "the river's end". Achernar is a very peculiar star because it is one of the flattest stars known. Observations indicate that its radius is about 50% larger at the equator than at the poles. This distortion occurs because the star is spinning extremely rapidly.

There are several other noteworthy stars in Eridanus, including some double stars. Beta Eridani, traditionally called Cursa, is a blue-white star of magnitude 2.8, 89 light-years from Earth. Its place to the south of Orion's foot gives it its name, which means "the footstool". Theta Eridani, called Acamar, is a binary star with blue-white components, distinguishable in small amateur telescopes and 161 light-years from Earth. The primary is of magnitude 3.2 and the secondary is of magnitude 4.3. 32 Eridani is a binary star 290 light-years from Earth. The primary is a yellow-hued star of magnitude 4.8 and the secondary is a blue-green star of magnitude 6.1. 32 Eridani is visible in small amateur telescopes. 39 Eridani is a binary star also divisible in small amateur telescopes, 206 light-years from Earth. The primary is an orange-hued giant star of magnitude 4.9 and the secondary is of magnitude 8. 40 Eridani is a triple star system consisting of an orange main-sequence star, a white dwarf, and a red dwarf. The orange main-sequence star is the primary of magnitude 4.4, and the white secondary of magnitude 9.5 is the most easily visible white dwarf. The red dwarf, of magnitude 11, orbits the white dwarf every 250 years. The 40 Eridani system is 16 light-years from Earth. p Eridani is a binary star with two orange components, 27 light-years from Earth. The magnitude 5.8 primary and 5.9 secondary have an orbital period of 500 years.

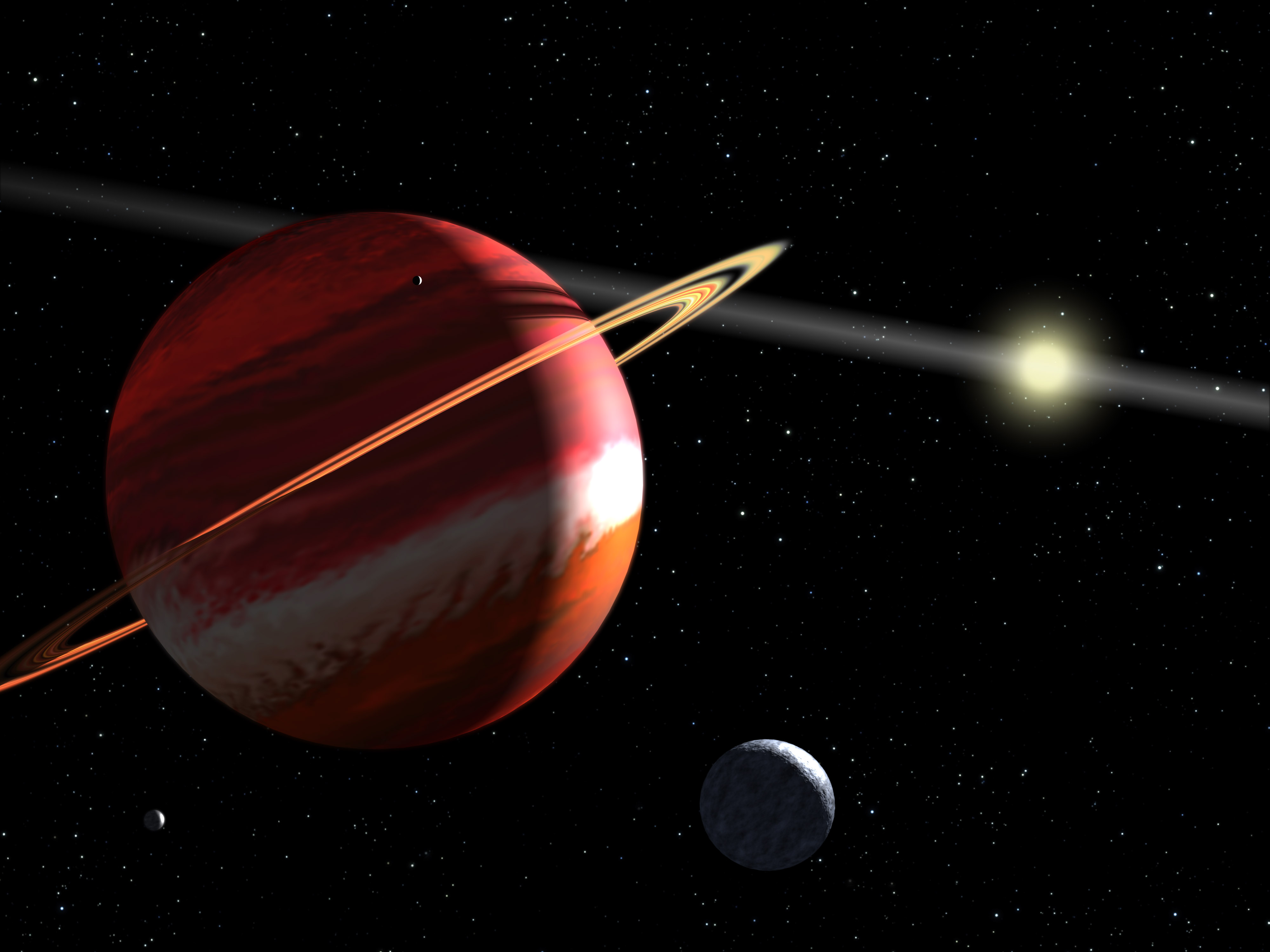
Artist's impression of a Jupiter-mass planet orbiting the nearby star Epsilon Eridani

Epsilon Eridani (Ran) is a star with one extrasolar planet similar to Jupiter. It is an orange-hued main-sequence star of magnitude 3.7, 10.5 light-years from Earth. Its one planet, with an approximate mass of one Jupiter mass, has a period of 7 years.

=== Supervoid ===
The Eridanus Supervoid is a large supervoid (an area of the universe devoid of galaxies) discovered as of 2007. At a diameter of about one billion light years it is the second largest known void, superseded only by the Giant Void in Canes Venatici. It was discovered by linking a "cold spot" in the cosmic microwave background to an absence of radio galaxies in data of the United States National Radio Astronomy Observatory's Very Large Array Sky Survey. There is some speculation that the void may be due to quantum entanglement between our universe and another.

=== Deep-sky objects ===
NGC 1535 is a small blue-gray planetary nebula visible in small amateur telescopes, with a disk visible in large amateur instruments. 2000 light-years away, it is of the 9th magnitude.

A portion of the Orion Molecular Cloud Complex can be found in the far northeastern section of Eridanus. IC 2118 is a faint reflection nebula believed to be an ancient supernova remnant or gas cloud illuminated by nearby supergiant star Rigel in Orion.

Eridanus contains the galaxies NGC 1232, NGC 1234, NGC 1291 and NGC 1300, a grand design barred spiral galaxy.

NGC 1300 is a face-on barred spiral galaxy located 61±8 million light-years away. The center of the bar shows an unusual structure: within the overall spiral structure, a grand design spiral that is 3,300 light-years in diameter exists. Its spiral arms are tightly wound.

=== Meteor showers ===
The Nu Eridanids, a recently discovered meteor shower, radiate from the constellation between August 30 and September 12 every year; the shower's parent body is an unidentified Oort cloud object. Another meteor shower in Eridanus is the Omicron Eridanids, which peak between November 1 and 10.

== Visualizations ==
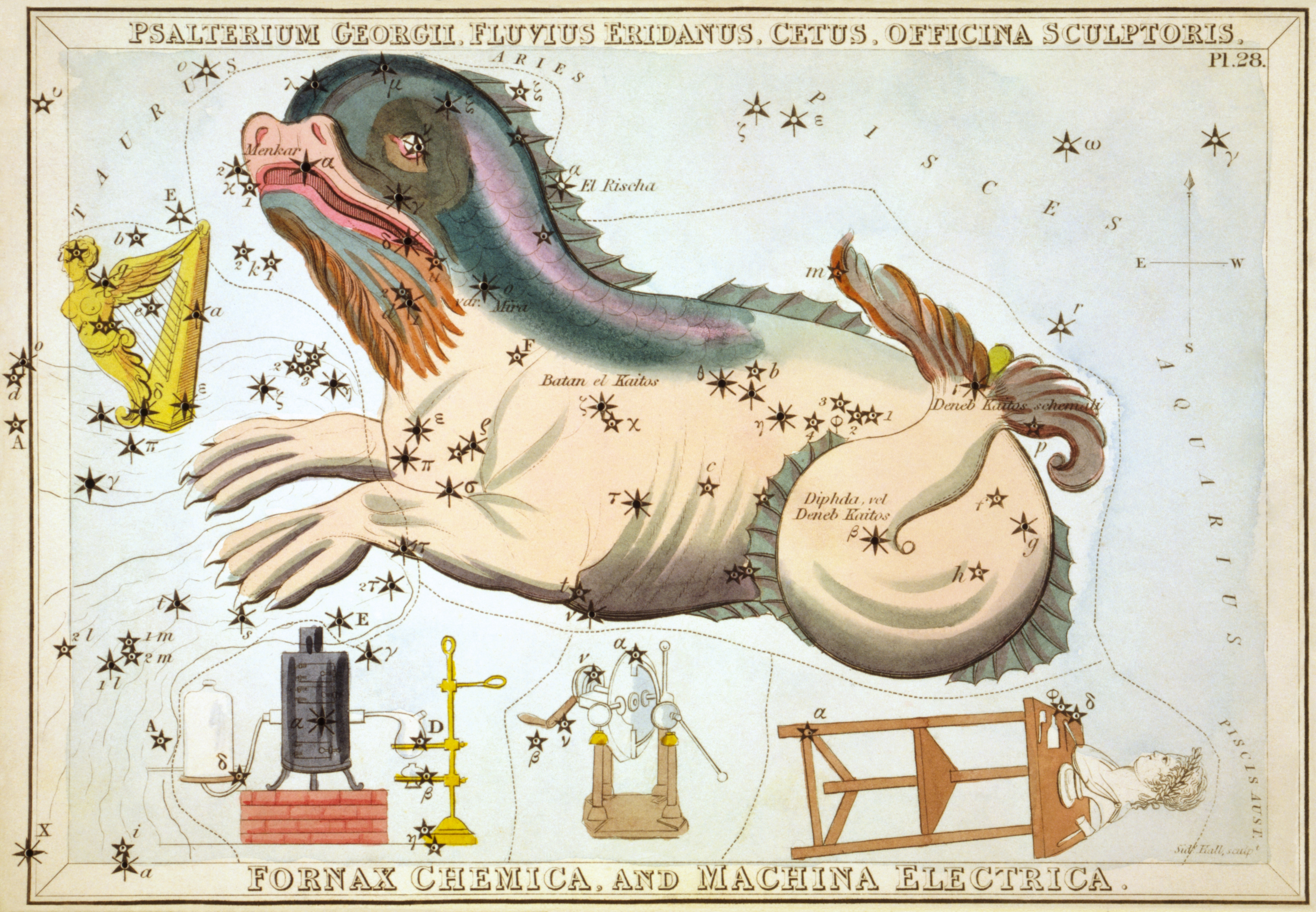
Cetus dips his paws into Eridanus in this plate from Urania's Mirror (1825).

Eridanus is depicted in ancient sky charts as a flowing river, starting from Orion and flowing in a meandering fashion past Cetus and Fornax and into the southern hemispheric stars. Johann Bayer's Uranometria depicts the river constellation as a flowing river.

== History and mythology ==
According to one theory, the Greek constellation takes its name from the Babylonian constellation known as the Star of Eridu (MUL.NUN.KI). Eridu was an ancient city in the extreme south of Babylonia; situated in the marshy regions it was held sacred to the god Enki-Ea who ruled the cosmic domain of the Abyss—a mythical conception of the fresh-water reservoir below the Earth's surface.

Eridanus is connected to the myth of Phaethon, who took over the reins of his father Helios' sky chariot (i.e., the Sun), but did not have the strength to control it and so veered wildly in different directions, scorching both Earth and heaven. Zeus intervened by striking Phaethon dead with a thunderbolt and casting him to Earth. The constellation was supposed to be the path Phaethon drove along; in later times, it was considered a path of souls. Since Eridanos was also a Greek name for the Po (Latin Padus), in which the burning body of Phaethon is said by Ovid to have extinguished, the mythic geography of the celestial and earthly Eridanus is complex.

Another association with Eridanus is a series of rivers all around the world. First conflated with the Nile River in Egypt, the constellation was also identified with the Po River in Italy. The stars of the modern constellation Fornax were formerly a part of Eridanus.

== Equivalents ==
The stars that correspond to Eridanus are also depicted as a river in Indian astronomy starting close to the head of Orion just below Auriga. Eridanus is called Srotaswini in Sanskrit, srótas meaning the course of a river or stream. Specifically, it is depicted as the Ganges on the head of Dakshinamoorthy or Nataraja, a Hindu incarnation of Shiva. Dakshinamoorthy himself is represented by the constellation Orion.

The stars that correspond to Eridanus cannot be fully seen from China. In Chinese astronomy, the northern part is located within the White Tiger of the West (西方白虎, Xī Fāng Bái Hǔ). The unseen southern part was classified among the Southern Asterisms (近南極星區, Jìnnánjíxīngqū) by Xu Guangqi, based on knowledge of western star charts.

== Namesakes ==
- USS Eridanus (AK-92) was a United States Navy Crater-class cargo ship named after the constellation.
- Éridan was a French cargo liner named after the constellation.

== See also ==
- Eridanus (Chinese astronomy)
- List of brightest stars
