= Astronomical catalogue =

Tabulated list of astronomical objects

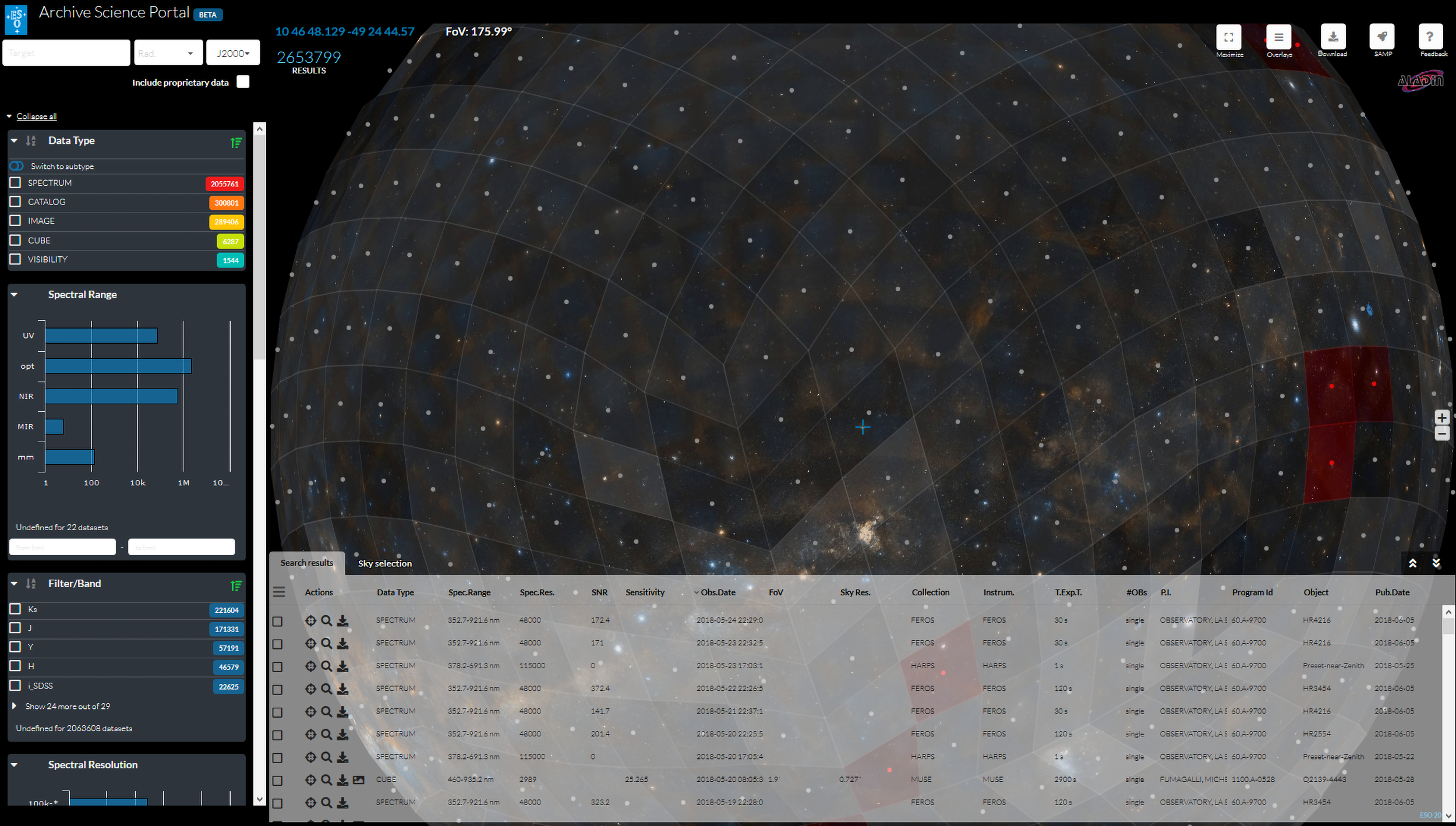
ESO Science Archive has been providing access to data from astronomical catalogues since 1988.

An astronomical catalogue is a list or tabulation of astronomical objects, typically grouped together because they share a common type, morphology, origin, means of detection, or method of discovery. The oldest and largest are star catalogues. Hundreds have been published, including general ones and special ones for such objects as infrared stars, variable stars, giant stars, multiple star systems, star clusters, and so forth.

General catalogues for deep-sky objects or for objects other than stars are also large. Again, there are specialized ones for nebulas, galaxies, X-ray sources, radio sources, quasars and other classes. The same is true for asteroids, comets and other solar system bodies.

Astronomical catalogues such as those for asteroids may be compiled from multiple sources, but most modern catalogues are the result of a particular astronomical survey of some kind. Since the late 20th century, catalogues are increasingly often compiled by computers from an automated survey, and published as computer files rather than on paper.

== Some notable catalogues ==
- Ptolemy's Almagest was published in the 2nd century AD. It remained the most authoritative text on astronomy for over 1500 years. It details over 1022 stars, constellations, galaxies and nebulae along with their positions, ecliptic coordinates and magnitudes. It also describes in detail the construction of astronomical instruments.
- Abd al-Rahman al-Sufi's Book of Fixed Stars, published in 964, describes more than a thousand stars in detail and provides the first descriptions of the Andromeda Galaxy and the Large Magellanic Cloud.
- Tycho Brahe completed his catalogue with the positions and magnitudes of 1004 fixed stars in 1598. It was the major achievement in astronomy since the days of Ptolemy. Brahe's astrometric observations greatly improved on the positional accuracy achieved by his predecessors.
- Johann Bayer's Uranometria star atlas was published in 1603, with over 1200 stars. Names combine a Greek letter with a constellation name: for example, Alpha Centauri.
- John Flamsteed's Historia coelestis Britannica star atlas, published in 1725, lists 2,935 stars using numbers combined with constellation, for example 61 Cygni, and ordered by right ascension.
- The Messier catalogue: the Messier objects are a set of astronomical objects first listed by French astronomer Charles Messier in 1771. Nebulae and Star Clusters was published in 1781, with objects M1–M110.
- The New General Catalogue or NGC, compiled in the 1880s by J. L. E. Dreyer, lists objects NGC 0001 – NGC 7840. It is one of the largest historical comprehensive catalogues, as it includes all types of non-stellar deep space objects.
- Henry Draper's Henry Draper Catalogue, published between 1918 and 1924, lists more than 225,000 of the brightest stars, named using HD followed by a 6-digit number.
- Sir Patrick Moore compiled the Caldwell catalogue in 1995 for amateur astronomers, as a complement to the Messier catalogue. It lists 109 bright star clusters, nebulae, and galaxies, named C1 to C109, and is a list of deep-sky objects of interest rather than a catalogue in the professional science sense. Other deep-sky observing lists for amateur astronomers predated it.

== See also ==
- List of astronomical catalogues
- Astrograph – a type of instrument used to produce astronomical catalogues.
- Star catalogue – discusses various types in more detail
