= Rucbah =

The traditional star name Rucbah or Ruchba (from the Arabic word ركبة rukbah meaning "knee") has been applied to four different stars:

- Alpha Aquarii in the constellation Aquarius (this star is now called Sadalmelik by the IAU)
- Delta Cassiopeiae in the constellation Cassiopeia (this star is now called Ruchbah by the IAU)
- Alpha Sagittarii in the constellation Sagittarius (this star is now called Rukbat by the IAU, but was sometimes known as Al Rami)
- Omega Cygni, an optical double in the constellation Cygnus
