= Theta Cassiopeiae =

Star in the constellation Cassiopeia

- Location of θ Cassiopeiae (circled)

Observation data Epoch J2000.0 Equinox J2000.0 (ICRS)
- Constellation: Cassiopeia
- Right ascension: 01^{h} 11^{m} 06.162^{s}
- Declination: +55° 08′ 59.64″
- Apparent magnitude (V): 4.334

Characteristics
- Evolutionary stage: main sequence
- Spectral type: A7 V
- U−B color index: +0.130
- B−V color index: +0.170
- Variable type: Suspected δ Sct

Astrometry
Radial velocity (R_{v})	2.5±0.6 km/s
Proper motion (μ)	RA: +226.056 mas/yr Dec.: −19.541 mas/yr
Parallax (π)	23.8844±0.1136 mas
Distance	136.6 ± 0.6 ly (41.9 ± 0.2 pc)
Absolute magnitude (M_{V})	+1.28

Details
Mass	1.9 M_{☉}
Radius	2.5 R_{☉}
Luminosity	23 L_{☉}
Surface gravity (log g)	3.91 cgs
Temperature	7,954 K
Metallicity [Fe/H]	+0.07 dex
Rotational velocity (v sin i)	103 km/s
Age	650 Myr

Other designations
- Marfak, θ Cas, 33 Cassiopeiae, BD+54°236, HD 6961, HIP 5542, HR 343, SAO 22070

Database references
SIMBAD	data

Theta Cassiopeiae is a solitary star in the northern constellation of Cassiopeia. Its name is a Bayer designation that is Latinized from θ Cassiopeiae, and abbreviated Theta Cas or θ Cas. It shares the traditional name Marfak /ˈmɑːrfæk/ with μ Cassiopeiae, positioned less than half a degree to the WSW, which is derived from the Arabic term Al Marfik or Al Mirfaq (المرفق), meaning "the elbow". At an apparent visual magnitude of 4.3,

Theta Cassiopeiae is visible to the naked eye. Based upon an annual parallax shift of 23.88 mas, it is located 136.6 light-years (41.9 pc) from the Sun. It has a total annual proper motion of 0.227 arcseconds per year, and is slowly drifting further away from the Sun with a radial velocity of 2.5 km/s.

In Chinese, 閣道 (Gé Dào), meaning Flying Corridor, refers to an asterism consisting of θ Cassiopeiae, ι Cassiopeiae, ε Cassiopeiae, δ Cassiopeiae, ν Cassiopeiae and ο Cassiopeiae. Consequently, θ Cassiopeiae itself is known as 閣道四 (Gé Dào sì, English: the Fourth Star of Flying Corridor.)

This is an A-type main sequence star with a stellar classification of A7 V. The star has 1.9 times the Sun's mass and 2.5 times the Sun's radius. It is about 650 million years in age and is spinning with a projected rotational velocity of 103 km/s. The star is radiating 23 times the luminosity of the Sun from its photosphere at an effective temperature of 7,954 K. This is a candidate Vega-type system, which means it displays an infrared excess suggesting it has an orbiting debris disk. It is a suspected Delta Scuti variable.

The star appears to be a member of a leading tidal tail of the Hyades cluster.
