= Marfak =

The traditional star name Marfak may refer to:

- α Persei
- the pair θ Cassiopeiae and μ Cassiopeiae

The name is derived from an Arabic word مرفق marfaq, meaning "elbow".
