= Messier 103 =

Open cluster in the constellation Cassiopeia

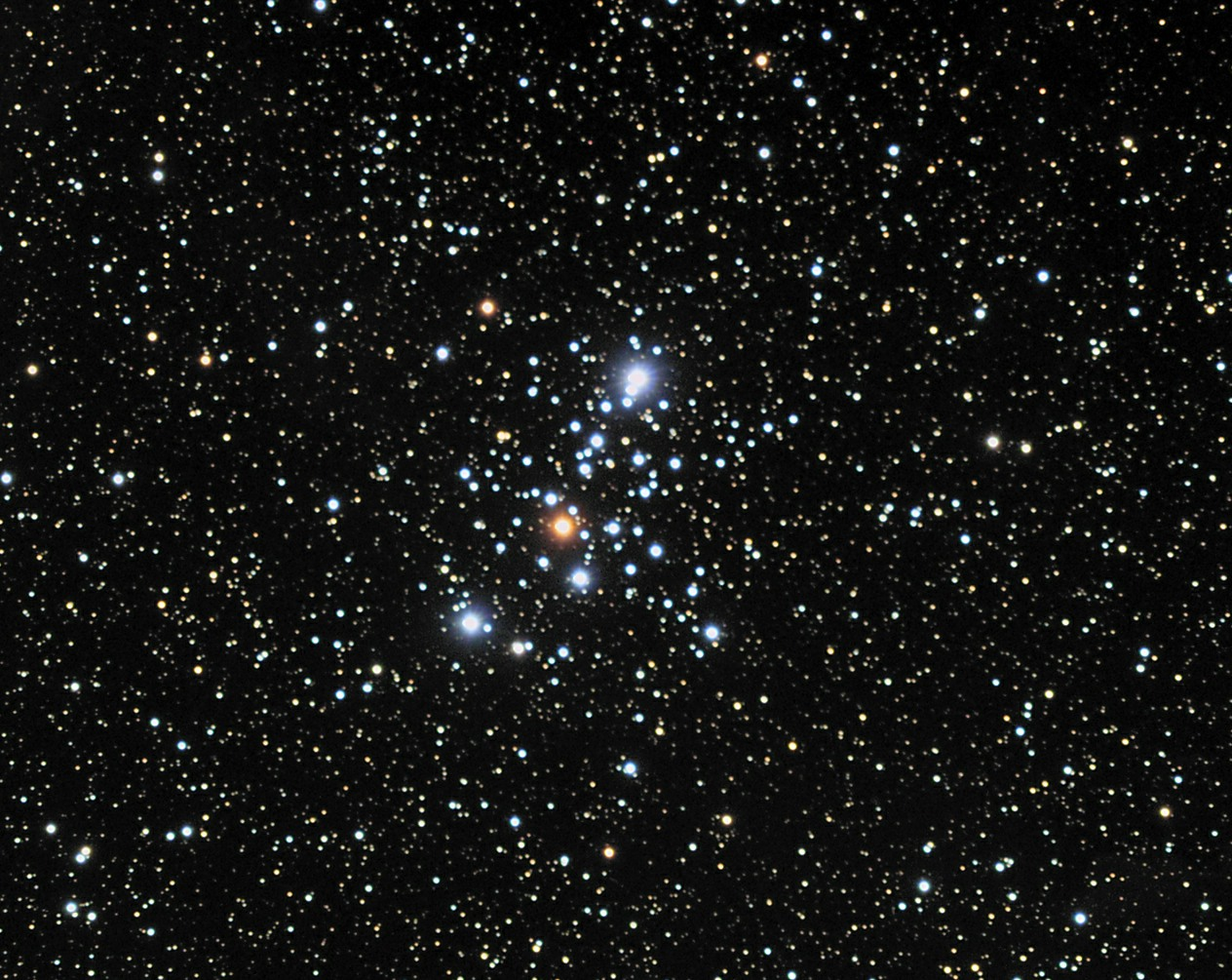
- Open cluster Messier 103 in Cassiopeia

Observation data (J2000.0 epoch)
- Right ascension: 01^{h} 33.2^{m}
- Declination: +60° 42′
- Distance: 9,400 light-years (2.884 ± 0.313 kpc)
- Apparent magnitude (V): 7.4
- Apparent dimensions (V): 6.0'

Physical characteristics
- Estimated age: 12.6 ± 0.2 million years
- Other designations: NGC 581, Cr 14

Associations

Messier 103 (also known as M103, or NGC 581) is a small open cluster of many faint stars in Cassiopeia. It was discovered on 27 March 1781 by Pierre Méchain, but later added as Charles Messier's last deep-sky object in his catalogue.

It is located 9,400 light-years from the Sun and is about 15 light years across. It holds two prominent stars, of which the brightest is magnitude 10.5, and in the center of the cluster, another magnitude 10.8 red giant. Another bright foreground object is the double star Struve 131, but is not a member of the cluster. Cluster membership is about 172 stars based on >50% probability of gravitational attachment that binds the cluster together. M103 is between 12.6 to 25 million years in age.

== Observation history ==
After the discovery of Messier 101 through 103 by Pierre Méchain, Messier later added this open cluster to his own catalogue. In 1783, William Herschel described the region of M103 as 14 to 16 pL (pretty large stars) and with great many eS or extremely faint ones. Åke Wallenquist first identified 40 stars in M103 while Antonín Bečvář raised this to 60. Archinal and Hynes suggest that the cluster has 172 stars. Admiral William Henry Smyth pointed out the cluster's 10.8-magnitude red giant, citing it was a double star on Cassiopeia's knee, about 1° northeast of Delta Cassiopeiae, sometimes called as Ruchbah or Rukhbah.

== Telescopic view ==
Messier 103 is an easy object to find and the cluster is visible in binoculars or a small telescope. M103 can be seen as a nebulous fan-shaped patch, and is about a fifth the apparent diameter of the Moon or 6 arcminute (6′) or 0.1° across. To find M103, it is suggested that the observer center on Ruchbah or the lowest star of the signature “W” asterism of Cassiopeia. The cluster will appear as a hazy patch in a field about 1/3 the length of an imaginary line towards Epsilon Cassiopeiae, a northern endpoint of the 'W', and placed on the outer side of the 'W'.

== Gallery ==
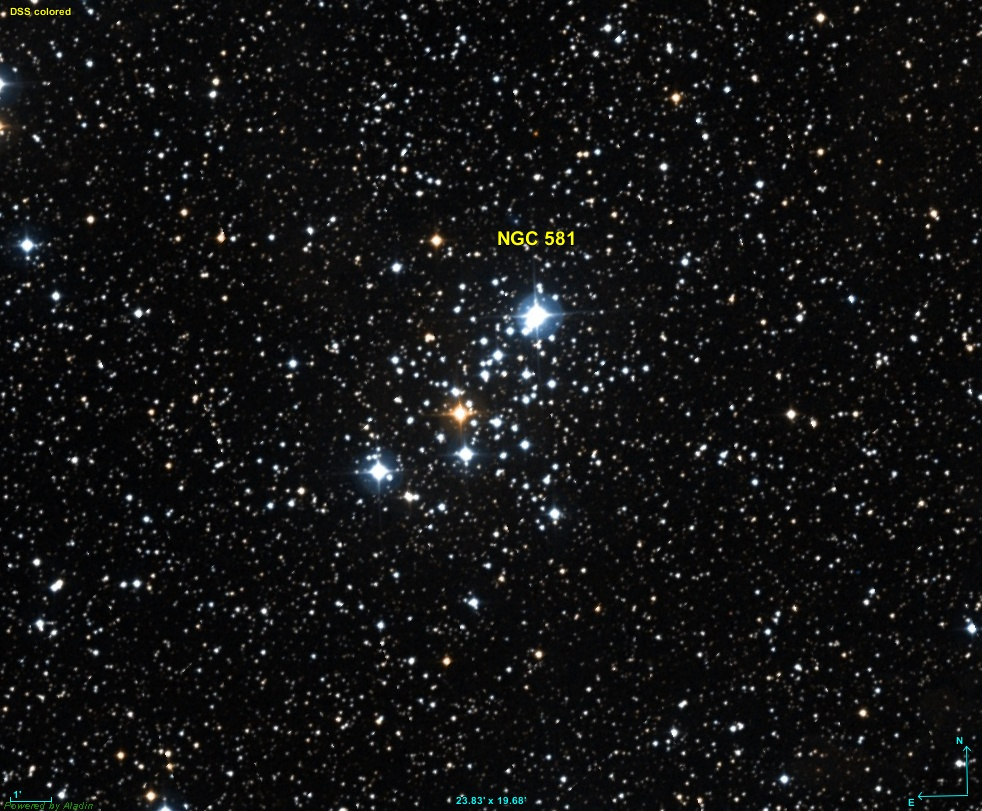
M103 image from Aladin Sky Atlas

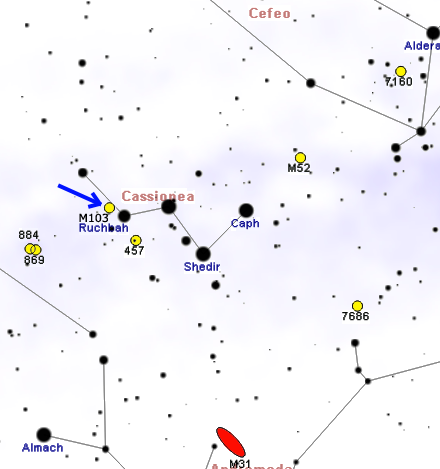
Finder chart for M103

== See also ==
- List of Messier objects
