= December Phi Cassiopeiids =

Meteor shower

December Phi Cassiopeiids (DPC)
- Discovery date: 2011
- Parent body: Biela's Comet

Radiant
- Constellation: Cassiopeia (near Phi Cassiopeiae)
- Right ascension: 1^{h} 19^{m}
- Declination: +58° 17′

Properties
- Occurs during: 28 November – 10 December
- Date of peak: 2 December
- Velocity: 17 km/s
- Zenithal hourly rate: 200

The December Phi Cassiopeiids are a meteor shower beginning on the 28th of November and lasting until the 10th of December. It is visible from the Northern Hemisphere.

It originated with the 1649 perihelion of Biela's Comet. Activity is centered in eastern Cassiopeia, about one degree away from the star Ruchbach. It one of multiple meteor showers associated with Biela's Comet, the most famous of them being the Andromedids.
