= Skalnate Pleso Atlas of the Heavens =

Set of celestial charts

Atlas Coeli 1950.0
- One chart from the color Atlas

The Skalnaté Pleso Atlas of the Heavens (Atlas Coeli Skalnaté Pleso 1950.0) is a set of 16 celestial charts covering the entire sky. It is named after the Skalnaté Pleso Observatory in Slovakia where it was produced. The first versions were published by the Czechoslovak Astronomical Society in 1948; later that year, Sky Publishing Corporation acquired the copyright and began publication in the United States. The charts were hand-drawn by Antonín Bečvář.

At the time it was first published, the Atlas Coeli was unique in that it contained essentially all non-stellar objects (star clusters, galaxies etc.) that were visible in an 8-inch telescope, in addition to stars brighter than magnitude 7.75. Until the mid-1970s when it went out of print, the Atlas was extremely popular among amateur astronomers, especially those engaged in comet hunting and the study of variable stars. The Atlas Coeli was also widely used by professional astronomers. Many astronomical observatories still contain copies.

== Description ==
The Atlas Coeli covers both hemispheres with 16 charts. The coordinate system is referred to equinox 1950.0 and the scale is 1° = 0.75 cm. There are six charts of the equatorial regions on a rectangular graticule, covering declinations from +25° to -25°; four charts for each hemisphere with straight, converging hour circles and concentric, equally-spaced declination circles covering declinations 20° - 65°; and, for each hemisphere, a circumpolar chart covering declination 65° to the pole. All stars brighter than 7.75 magnitude are included, for a total of 32,571. The stellar magnitudes are indicated by circles with graded sizes. Double and multiple stars are identified and visual binaries are differentiated from spectroscopic binaries. All known variable stars are identified, including novae that had maxima brighter than magnitude 7.75 (totalling 443). 249 star clusters are shown and their relative size indicated. All known globular clusters are shown. 1,130 extragalactic systems are included as are many Galactic objects including planetary nebulae. Bright and dark diffuse nebulae are shown, and the actual outlines of those larger than 10' in diameter are painstakingly drawn. The Milky Way and prominent obscuring clouds within it are indicated by isophotic lines. Constellation boundaries are clearly but unobtrusively drawn. The celestial equator and ecliptic are indicated. The brightest radio sources are also shown.

The Atlas Coeli is famous for its clean appearance and for the wealth of data it contains. The drawing is beautifully and precisely done and the printing is excellent. Many other star charts have been strongly influenced by the style of the Atlas Coeli. For instance, the popular Sky Atlas 2000.0 of Wil Tirion adopted the symbols for various types of objects, the division of scales, and the script directly from the Atlas Coeli.

== Origin ==
The Atlas Coeli was created in the period 1947-1948 at the Skalnaté Pleso Observatory in Slovakia (then Czechoslovakia) under the direction of Antonín Bečvář, based on an idea of Czechoslovak amateur astronomer Josef Klepešta. Much of the work was carried out by a volunteer group of students at the Observatory; the final plotting of the Atlas, which was entirely hand-drawn, was the work of Bečvář. Positional and magnitude data were taken from a number of existing catalogs, including the Henry Draper catalog, the Aitken New General Catalog of Double Stars, and the Boss General Catalog. About ten photographic atlases were used as well. To plot each of the objects, one of 20 stencil patterns was selected and positioned. It was also necessary to compute the shift in the apparent position of each of the objects to epoch 1950.0. About 3,000 man-hours of work were involved.

== The Catalogue of Atlas ==
Immediately after publication of the Atlas Coeli, a supplement was produced called the Atlas Coeli II - Katalog 1950.0. The Catalogue contains data and descriptions of approximately 12000 objects plotted in the Atlas . All stars to magnitude 6.25 are included as well as a large number of the non-stellar objects. Stellar data includes the 1950.0 coordinates with their annual variations; proper motion; apparent magnitude (Revised Harvard Photometric [RHP, or HR] system); absolute magnitude; spectral type (Mt. Wilson scheme); parallax; radial velocity; standard name of star and its constellation; and notes indicating if the star is double or variable.

The Catalogue includes a number of other tables with data on double and multiple stars, galactic and extragalactic nebulae, and radio sources.

=== Novel star names ===
Paul Kunitzsch found 14 proper names of stars that are first attested in the catalogue, and for which he was unable to find any clues as to their origin. For two more he suggested etymologies, but without antecedents in the literature. These 14 stars are:

- Achird (η Cas),
- Arich (γ Vir),
- Haris (γ Boo),
- Hassaleh (ι Aur),
- Hatysa (ι Ori),
- Heze (ζ Vir),
- Kaffa (δ UMa),
- Kraz (β Crv),
- Ksora (δ Cas),
- Kuma (ν Dra),
- Reda (γ Aql),
- Sarin (δ Her),
- Segin (ε Cas),
- Tyl (ε Dra)

The two that may have explanations are "Segin" (ε Cas), possibly a written variant of "Seginus" (γ Boo), and "Haris", possibly a derivation from ħāris al-shamāl "Guardian of the North", the Arabic name of Bootes or Arcturus. For the others, there is no apparent explanation in Latin, Greek or Arabic. Kunitzsch spent fifteen years trying to trace the origins of these names in earlier sources and by contacting Czechoslovak astronomers who might know of former collaborators of Bečvář's, but without success.

Amateur astronomers German Hans Vehrenberg and English Patrick Moore follow these names.

As of 2026, the IAU has accepted Achird, Hassaleh, Hatysa, Heze, Kraz, Sarin and Segin as official names for those stars. Most of the remaining stars have different names; ε Dra (Tyl) remains without an IAU name. Tyl may have been named by Bečvář after Czech writer Josef Kajetán Tyl, so the IAU has not applied it officially as they want to avoid naming stars after people.

== Publication history ==
A six-color improved version of the Atlas was published by the Czechoslovak Academy of Sciences in 1956. The copyright to publish the Atlas outside of Czechoslovakia was purchased by Sky Publishing Corporation in 1949. Under this copyright, the Atlas was published in a series of editions, from a luxurious, full-color version to a black-and-white version of size 23 in × 15 in (58 cm × 38 cm). Pursuant to Bečvář's request, royalties were used to purchase special astronomical photographic plates for the Skalnaté Observatory.

Bečvář went on to create a number of other atlases: Atlas Eclipticalis (the celestial region between −30° and +30° declination on 32 maps), Atlas Borealis (the celestial region north of declination +30° on 24 maps), and Atlas Australis (the celestial region south of declination −30° on 24 maps). Stellar clusters and nebulae are not plotted, but a six-color press was used to distinguish six basic spectral classes of stars. These atlases were especially helpful in the early days of position measurements of artificial satellites.
