= Psi Cassiopeiae =

Star in the constellation Cassiopeia

ψ Cassiopeiae
- Location of ψ Cassiopeiae (circled)

Observation data Epoch J2000.0 Equinox J2000.0 (ICRS)
- Constellation: Cassiopeia
- Right ascension: 01^{h} 25^{m} 56.023^{s}
- Declination: +68° 07′ 48.05″
- Apparent magnitude (V): +4.72

Characteristics
- Evolutionary stage: red clump
- Spectral type: K0 III-IIIb CN0.5
- U−B color index: +0.94
- B−V color index: +1.051

Astrometry
Radial velocity (R_{v})	−12.7±0.3 km/s
Proper motion (μ)	RA: 74.122 mas/yr Dec.: 26.310 mas/yr
Parallax (π)	16.2403±0.1061 mas
Distance	201 ± 1 ly (61.6 ± 0.4 pc)
Absolute magnitude (M_{V})	0.869

Details

ψ Cas A
Mass	2.5 M_{☉}
Radius	11 R_{☉}
Luminosity	44 L_{☉}
Surface gravity (log g)	2.74 cgs
Temperature	4,442 K
Metallicity [Fe/H]	−0.13 dex
Age	5.2 Gyr

Other designations
- ψ Cas, 36 Cas, BD+67°123, FK5 46, HD 8491, HIP 6692, HR 399, SAO 11751, ADS 1129, CCDM J01259+6808, WDS J01259+6808A

Database references
SIMBAD	data

Psi Cassiopeiae is a binary star system in the northern constellation of Cassiopeia. Its name is a Bayer designation that is Latinized from ψ Cassiopeiae, and is abbreviated ψ Cas or Psi Cas. The pair have a combined apparent visual magnitude of +4.72, which is bright enough to be visible to the naked eye. Based on an annual parallax of 16.24 mas, it is located at a distance of approximately 201 light-years (62 pc). The system is drifting closer to the Sun with a line of sight velocity component of −13 km/s.

The orange-hued primary component, ψ Cassiopeiae A, has an apparent magnitude of +5.0; it is a double star, designated CCDM J01259+6808AB, with a fourteenth magnitude star (component B) located 3 arcseconds from the primary. Located about 25 arcseconds distant there is a 9.8 magnitude optical companion CCDM J01259+6808CD, designated ψ Cassiopeiae B in older star catalogues, which is itself another double; CD comprises a 9.4 magnitude component C and a 10 magnitude component D.

The primary has a stellar classification of K0 III-IIIb CN0.5, which presents as an evolved K-type giant star. The suffix notation indicates a mild overabundance of the CN molecule. It is a red clump giant, indicating it is on the horizontal branch of its evolutionary track. At an estimated age of 5.2 billion years, it has 2.5 times the mass of the Sun and has expanded to 11 times the Sun's radius. It is radiating 44 times the luminosity of the Sun from its photosphere at an effective temperature of 4,442 K.
