= Omega Cygni =

The Bayer designation Omega Cygni (ω Cyg / ω Cygni) is shared by two star systems, in the constellation Cygnus:

- ω^{1} Cygni
- ω^{2} Cygni

The name Ruchba has sometimes been used for one or both of these stars, from the Arabic Al Rukbah al Dajājah, the Hen's Knee, which was said by R. H. Allen's Star Names to be the name of "ω^{3}" Cygni, described with a position matching ω^{1} but a color matching ω^{2}. This is better known, with the spelling Ruchbah, as a name for δ Cassiopeiae.
