= Mu Cassiopeiae =

Binary star system

μ Cassiopeiae
- Location of μ Cassiopeiae (circled)

Observation data Epoch J2000 Equinox ICRS
- Constellation: Cassiopeia
- Right ascension: 01^{h} 08^{m} 16.30295^{s}
- Declination: +54° 55′ 12.5612″
- Apparent magnitude (V): 5.159 (5.14/11.45)

Characteristics
- Evolutionary stage: Main sequence
- Spectral type: G5Vb + M4V
- U−B color index: +0.10
- B−V color index: 0.695±0.006
- Variable type: Suspected

Astrometry
Radial velocity (R_{v})	−97.09±0.25 km/s
Proper motion (μ)	RA: +3,468.251 mas/yr Dec.: −1,564.844 mas/yr
Parallax (π)	130.2881±0.4348 mas
Distance	25.03 ± 0.08 ly (7.68 ± 0.03 pc)
Absolute magnitude (M_{V})	5.78/11.6

Orbit
Name	μ Cas B
Period (P)	21.568±0.015 yr
Semi-major axis (a)	0.9985±0.0013" (7.664 AU (Note: Semi-major axis in AU = $\frac{semimajor\ axis\ in\ seconds}{parallax\ in\ seconds}\ {{=}}\ \frac{0.9985}{0.1302881}$ = 7.664 AU; as the eccentricity is 0.59, the distance fluctuates between 41% and 159% of that, roughly from 3.154 AU to 12.17 AU.))
Eccentricity (e)	0.5885±0.0011
Inclination (i)	110.671±0.064°
Longitude of the node (Ω)	223.868±0.064°
Periastron epoch (T)	1,997.2235±0.0067
Argument of periastron (ω) (secondary)	330.37±0.18°

Details

Aa
Mass	0.7440±0.0122 M_{☉}
Radius	0.789±0.008 R_{☉}
Luminosity	0.445±0.005 L_{☉}
Surface gravity (log g)	4.515±0.011 cgs
Temperature	5,306±31 K
Metallicity [Fe/H]	−0.81±0.03 dex
Rotational velocity (v sin i)	2.4 km/s
Age	12.7±2.7 Gyr

Ab
Mass	0.1728±0.0035 M_{☉}
Radius	0.29 R_{☉}
Luminosity	0.0062 L_{☉}
Temperature	3,025 K

Other designations
- Marfak, μ Cas, 30 Cassiopeiae, BD+54°223, FK5 1030, GC 1360, GJ 53, HD 6582, HIP 5336, HR 321, SAO 22024, CCDM J01080+5455, LFT 107, LHS 8, LTT 10460

Database references
SIMBAD	data

Mu Cassiopeiae is a binary star system in the constellation Cassiopeia. Its name is a Bayer designation that is Latinized from μ Cassiopeiae, and abbreviated Mu Cas or μ Cas. This system shares the name Marfak /ˈmɑːrfæk/ with Theta Cassiopeiae, and the name was from Al Marfik or Al Mirfaq (المرفق), meaning "the elbow". It is dimly visible to the naked eye as a point of light with an apparent visual magnitude of 5.16. The system is located at a distance of 25 light-years (7.6 parsecs) from the Sun based on parallax, and is moving closer with a high radial velocity of −97 km/s. This star will move into the constellation Perseus around 5200 AD.

Mu Cassiopeiae is given as a standard star for the spectral class G5Vb, although it is frequently described as a subdwarf, meaning it has a luminosity below that expected for a G5 main sequence star. The metallicity, or abundance of heavy elements, is about one-sixth that in the Sun. It is slightly smaller than the Sun with less mass and a lower luminosity. It is among the oldest known stars, with an age of 12.7±2.7 billion years making it possibly the oldest star visible to the unaided eye.

This is one of the first high-velocity stars to be identified. Compared to other nearby stars including the Sun, this pair are moving at a relatively high velocity of 167 km/s through the Milky Way galaxy. They are low metal, Population II stars that are thought to have formed before the galactic disk first appeared.

== Companions ==
There are five visible companions to Mu Cassiopeiae listed in the Washington Double Star Catalog. All are distant background objects fainter than 11th magnitude. The brightest of these is catalogued as component B, but the very high proper motion of Mu Cassiopeiae has caused it to almost double its distance from B. There are now two other stars brighter than magnitude 10 that are closer to Mu Cassiopeiae, although they are also background objects. The companions C and D are separated from each-other by four arc seconds and form a binary system about 4,000 ly away. Mu Cassiopeiae itself is known as an astrometric binary, a star that is observed to oscillate due to the gravitational influence of an unseen companion, and that companion has now been resolved.

In 1961, the close binary nature of this system was discovered by Nicholas E. Wagman at the Allegheny Observatory. Since then the orbital elements of the two stars have been fairly well established. The two stars are separated by a semimajor axis of 7.61 AU with distance range of 3.3-11.9 AU. In 1966, the individual components were first resolved by the American astronomer Peter A. Wehinger using the 84-inch reflector at the Kitt Peak National Observatory, allowing an initial estimate of separate masses. The companion is over six magnitudes (330 times) fainter than the primary star, and it is presumed to be a red dwarf, a class M main sequence or subdwarf star.

== See also ==
- List of nearest G-type stars
