= Tycho G =

Star in the constellation Cassiopeia

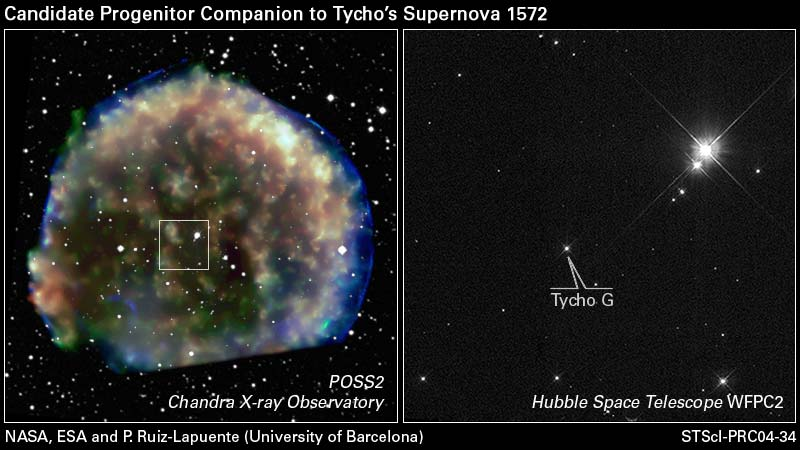
- Tycho G as seen by Hubble; Credit: NASA, ESA, CXO and P. Ruiz-Lapuente (University of Barcelona)

Observation data Epoch J2000 Equinox J2000
- Constellation: Cassiopeia
- Right ascension: 00^{h} 25^{m} 23.59578^{s}
- Declination: +64° 08′ 02.0297″
- Apparent magnitude (V): 18.71

Characteristics
- Evolutionary stage: subgiant
- Spectral type: G0/1 IV

Astrometry
Radial velocity (R_{v})	−79.22 km/s
Proper motion (μ)	RA: −2.50 mas/yr Dec.: −4.22 mas/yr
Parallax (π)	0.5189±0.0993 mas
Distance	approx. 6,000 ly (approx. 1,900 pc)

Details
Mass	1.0 M_{☉}
Radius	1.32–2.63 R_{☉}
Luminosity	1.9–7.6 L_{☉}
Surface gravity (log g)	4.0 cgs
Temperature	6,025 K
Metallicity	−0.13
Rotational velocity (v sin i)	< 6 km/s
Age	5.7 Gyr

Other designations
- Tycho G, 2MASS J00252358+6408019

Database references
SIMBAD	data

Tycho G has been proposed as the surviving binary companion star of the SN 1572 supernova event. The star is located about 6,500±1,300 light-years away in the constellation Cassiopeia. It is a subgiant, similar to the Sun in temperature, but more evolved and luminous.

== Origin of the name ==
The supernova SN 1572 is often called "Tycho's supernova", named after Tycho Brahe who observed the "new star" in 1572. The postfix "G" originates from the candidate companion stars considered in a 2004 study, labelled Tycho A to Tycho V.

== Evidence for companion hypothesis ==
Tycho G is travelling away from us at nearly 80 km/s, much faster than the mean velocity of other stars in its stellar neighbourhood. It matches the properties of some models for the pre-supernova star system, although other studies exclude it.

== See also ==
- List of supernova remnants
