= Chi Persei =

Chi Persei (Chi Per, χ Persei, χ Per) is the name of a star and an open cluster:

- χ Persei, the star 7 Persei
- χ Persei, or NGC 884, one half of the Double Cluster
