= AO Cassiopeiae =

Star system in the constellation Cassiopeia

AO Cas
- Location of AO Cas (circled)

Observation data Epoch J2000 Equinox ICRS
- Constellation: Cassiopeia
- Right ascension: 00^{h} 17^{m} 43.063^{s}
- Declination: +51° 25′ 59.12″
- Apparent magnitude (V): 6.07-6.24

Characteristics
- Spectral type: O8V((f)) + O9.2II
- U−B color index: −0.97
- B−V color index: −0.13
- Variable type: Eclipsing Variable star

Astrometry
Radial velocity (R_{v})	−31.10 km/s
Proper motion (μ)	RA: −2.988 mas/yr Dec.: −2.374 mas/yr
Parallax (π)	0.7546±0.0579 mas
Distance	4,300 ± 300 ly (1,300 ± 100 pc)
Absolute magnitude (M_{V})	−4.7

Orbit
Period (P)	3.52348 days
Semi-major axis (a)	28.57 R_{☉}
Eccentricity (e)	0
Inclination (i)	65.7°
Semi-amplitude (K_{1}) (primary)	143.7 km/s
Semi-amplitude (K_{2}) (secondary)	230.6 km/s

Details

Main sequence
Mass	15.59 M_{☉}
Radius	4.61 R_{☉}
Luminosity	66,000 L_{☉}
Surface gravity (log g)	4.30 cgs
Temperature	33,675 K
Rotational velocity (v sin i)	130 km/s

Giant
Mass	9.65 M_{☉}
Radius	9.43 R_{☉}
Luminosity	115,000 L_{☉}
Surface gravity (log g)	3.45 cgs
Temperature	29,239 K
Rotational velocity (v sin i)	120 km/s

Other designations
- Pearce's Star, AO Cas, HR 65, BD+50°46, HD 1337, SAO 21273, HIP 1415

Database references
SIMBAD	data

AO Cassiopeiae, also known as Pearce's Star, is a binary system composed of an O8 main sequence star and an O9.2 bright giant that respectively weigh anywhere between 20.30 and 57.75 times and 14.8 and 31.73 times the mass of the Sun.

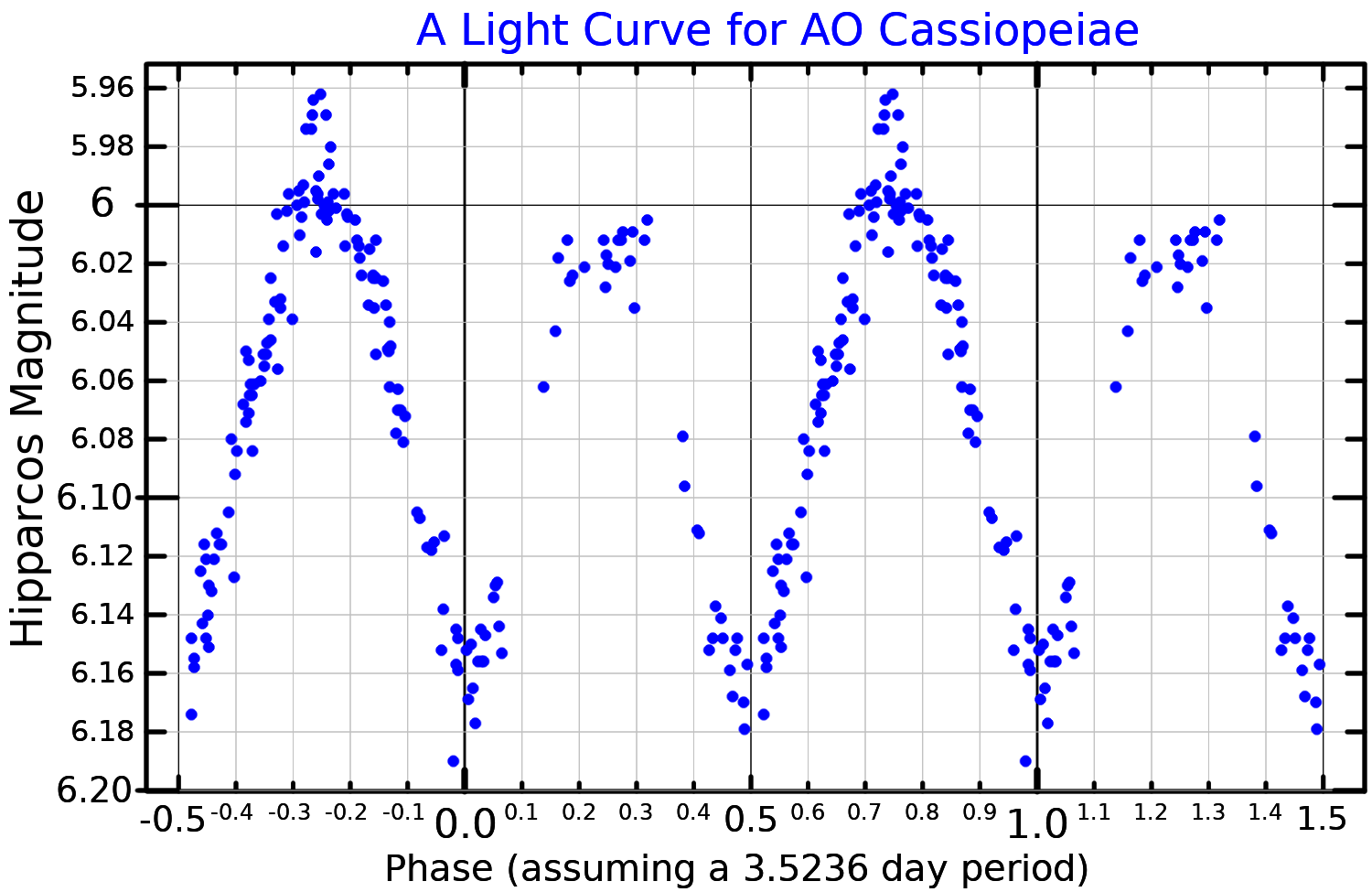
A light curve for AO Cassiopeiae, plotted from Hipparcos data

The AO Cas system is an eclipsing binary with a period of roughly 3.5 days, with the apparent magnitude ranging between 6.07 and 6.24. Stars of this brightness are generally just visible to the unaided eye in dark skies in semirural locations. The component stars are so close to each other they are ellipsoidal (egg-shaped). AO Cas is considered a contact binary, with both stars at or near their Roche lobes.
