= NGC 457 =

Open star cluster in the constellation Cassiopeia

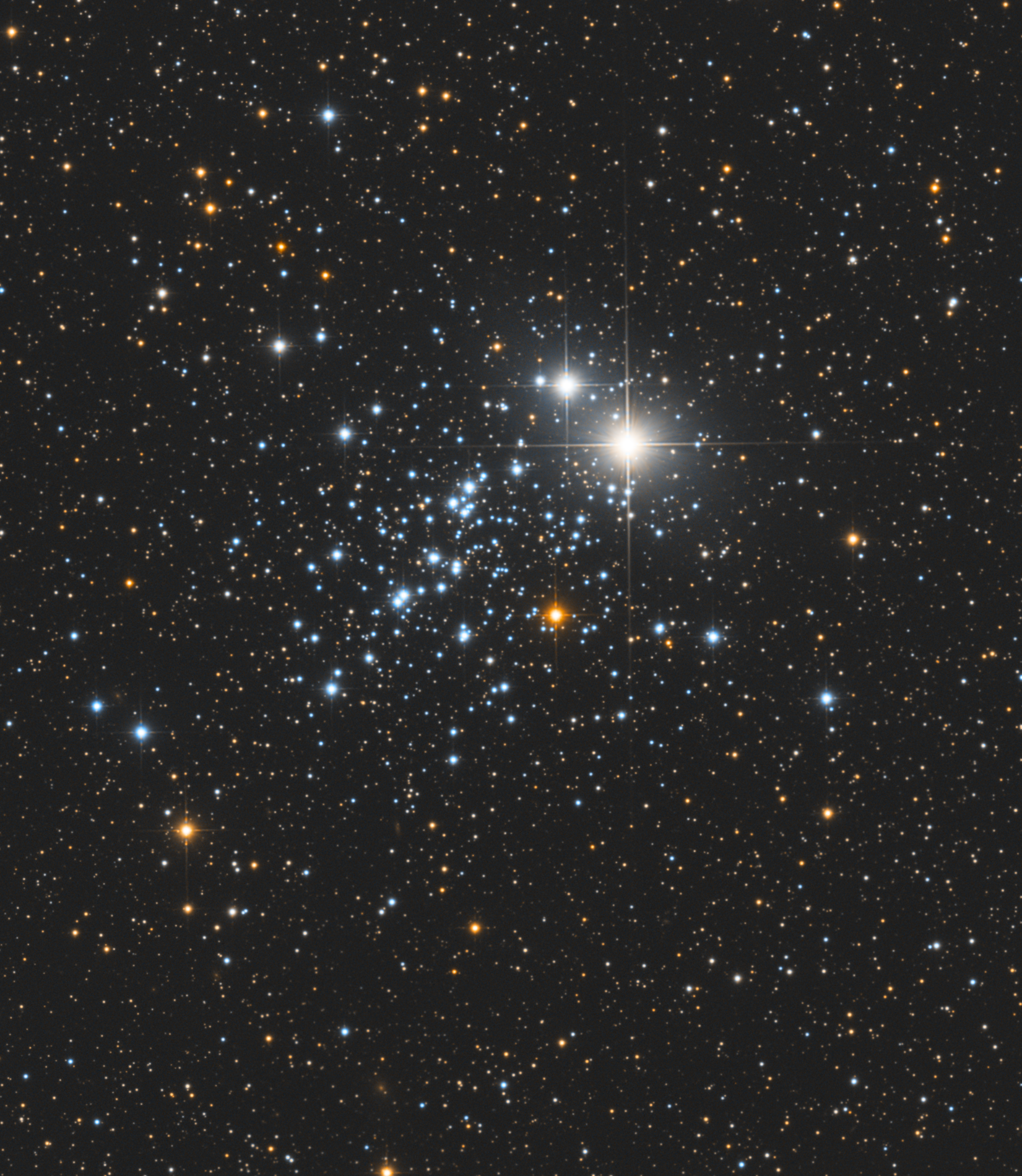
- Open cluster NGC 457 in Cassiopeia

Observation data (J2000.0 epoch)
- Right ascension: 01^{h} 19^{m} 32.6^{s}
- Declination: +58° 17′ 27″
- Distance: 7.922 kly (2.429 kpc)
- Apparent magnitude (V): 6.4
- Apparent dimensions (V): 20′

Physical characteristics
- Other designations: Owl Cluster, E.T. Cluster, Caldwell 13, Cr 12, Mel 7, OCL 321, Lund 43, H VII-42, h 97, GC 256,

Associations
- Constellation: Cassiopeia

NGC 457 is an open cluster of stars in the northern constellation of Cassiopeia. Alternatively, it is designated Caldwell 13, and also known as the Dragonfly Cluster, E.T. Cluster, Owl Cluster, Kachina Doll Cluster or Phi Cassiopeiae Cluster. It was discovered by German-British astronomer William Herschel on August 18, 1780, with a 6.2 inch reflector telescope, and catalogued as VII 42. This is an easy target for amateur astronomers, and can be seen even with small telescopes in light-polluted skies.

== Characteristics ==
It lies over 7,900 light years away from the Sun. It has an estimated age of 21 million years. The cluster is sometimes referred by amateur astronomers as the Owl Cluster or the E.T. Cluster (due to its resemblance to the movie character). Two bright stars Phi Cassiopeiae (magnitude 5 and spectral type F0) and HD 7902 (magnitude 7) can be imagined as eyes.

It is not yet clear if Phi Cassiopeiae is a member of the cluster, and if it is, then it would be one of the brightest stars known, surpassing Rigel in luminosity. For comparison, the Sun at the same distance as Phi Cassiopeiae would shine at just 17.3 magnitude. The next brightest star is the red supergiant variable star V466 Cassiopeiae. The cluster features a rich field of about 150 stars of magnitude 9-13. About 60 stars have been identified as true members of the cluster.

According to Stephen James O'Meara in Deep-Sky Companions: The Caldwell Objects (2002),

In photographs this roughly T-shaped pack of glittering suns looks like the stick figure of a man ready to greet you: two prominent stars at the cluster's southeastern end mark the figure's gaping eyes; two chains of stars on the northeastern and southwestern sides of the cluster's tapered body extend outward like wide-open arms; and two isolated suns at the cluster's northwestern end mark the figure's comfortably spaced feet. The cluster looks like it is not only happy to see you but wants to give you a hug.

— p. 58

Through the 4-inch at 23x the cluster has a more sinister appearance than it does in photographs. The cluster's bright "eyes" seem to pierce the night with the fiery gaze of a specter emerging from the dusty, cobwebbed corridors of space. The ghost's clothes hang in tatters from its skeletal limbs. The dusty cobwebs, of course, belong to the network of dark material that permeates the Cassiopeia Milky Way. The clothes, in contrast, belong to the combined glow of a hundred or more faint suns shimmering near or beyond the limit of resolution, like smoke rising from countless dying embers.

— pp. 60–1

== Gallery ==
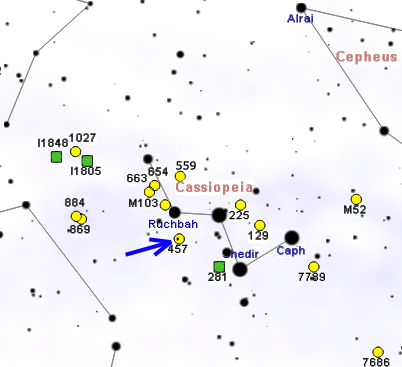
Map showing the location of NGC 457 in the constellation of Cassiopeia.

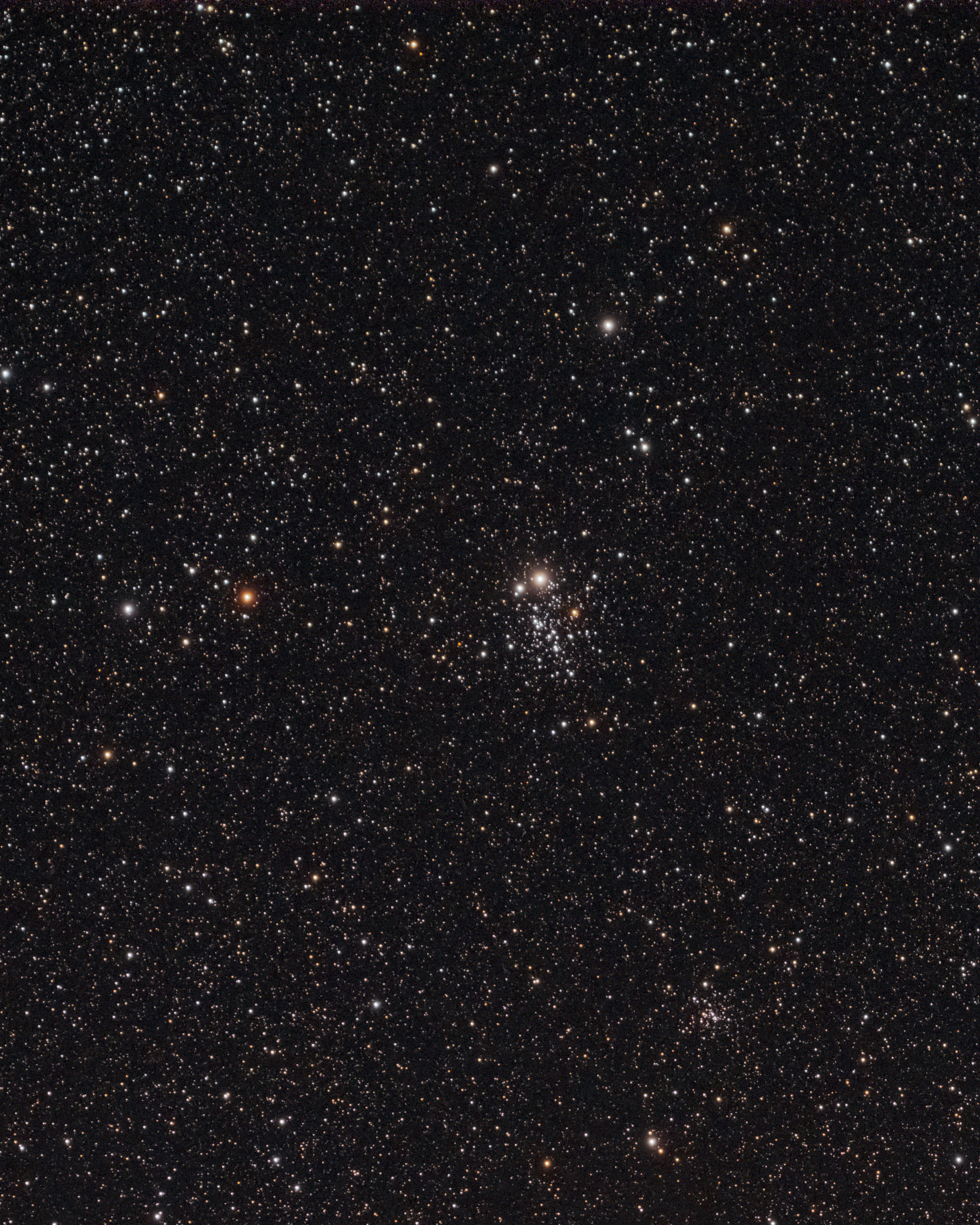
NGC 457 (center) pictured alongside open cluster NGC 436 (bottom right).
