= Phi Cassiopeiae =

Star in the constellation Cassiopeia

φ Cassiopeiae
- Location of φ Cassiopeiae (circled)

Observation data Epoch J2000.0 Equinox ICRS
- Constellation: Cassiopeia
- A
- Right ascension: 01^{h} 20^{m} 04.916^{s}
- Declination: +58° 13′ 53.81″
- Apparent magnitude (V): +5.11
- C
- Right ascension: 01^{h} 19^{m} 51.736^{s}
- Declination: +58° 12′ 29.32″
- Apparent magnitude (V): +7.08

Characteristics

A
- Spectral type: F0Ia
- U−B color index: +0.49
- B−V color index: +0.68

C
- Spectral type: B6Ib
- U−B color index: −0.37
- B−V color index: +0.41

Astrometry

A
Radial velocity (R_{v})	−28.39 km/s
Proper motion (μ)	RA: −1.479 mas/yr Dec.: −1.231 mas/yr
Parallax (π)	0.2142±0.0838 mas
Distance	approx. 15,000 ly (approx. 5,000 pc)
Absolute magnitude (M_{V})	−8.76

C
Radial velocity (R_{v})	−28.50 km/s
Proper motion (μ)	RA: −1.560 mas/yr Dec.: −0.809 mas/yr
Parallax (π)	0.3679±0.0169 mas
Distance	8,900 ± 400 ly (2,700 ± 100 pc)
Absolute magnitude (M_{V})	−6.5

Details

A
Mass	6.3–17 M_{☉}
Radius	263 R_{☉}
Luminosity	170,000 L_{☉}
Surface gravity (log g)	1.0 cgs
Temperature	7,341 K
Metallicity	-0.24
Rotational velocity (v sin i)	23 km/s
Age	20 Myr

C
Mass	21 M_{☉}
Radius	53 R_{☉}
Luminosity	83,000 L_{☉}
Surface gravity (log g)	2.05 cgs
Temperature	15,500 K
Rotational velocity (v sin i)	35 km/s

Other designations
- 34 Cassiopeiae, HR 382, ADS 1073, CCDM J01200+5813
- A: BD+57°260, GC 1594, HD 7927, HIP 6242, SAO 22191
- C: NSV 466, BD+57°257, GC 1590, HD 7902, HIP 6229, SAO 22187

Database references
SIMBAD	data

Phi Cassiopeiae is a multiple star system in the northern constellation of Cassiopeia. Its name is a Bayer designation that is Latinized from φ Cassiopeiae, and abbreviated Phi Cas or φ Cas. With a combined apparent magnitude of +4.95, it is visible to the naked eye. The two brightest components are A and C, sometimes called φ^{1} and φ^{2} Cas. φ Cas A is an F0 bright supergiant of magnitude 5.11 and φ Cas C is a 7.08 magnitude B6 supergiant at 134".

== System ==
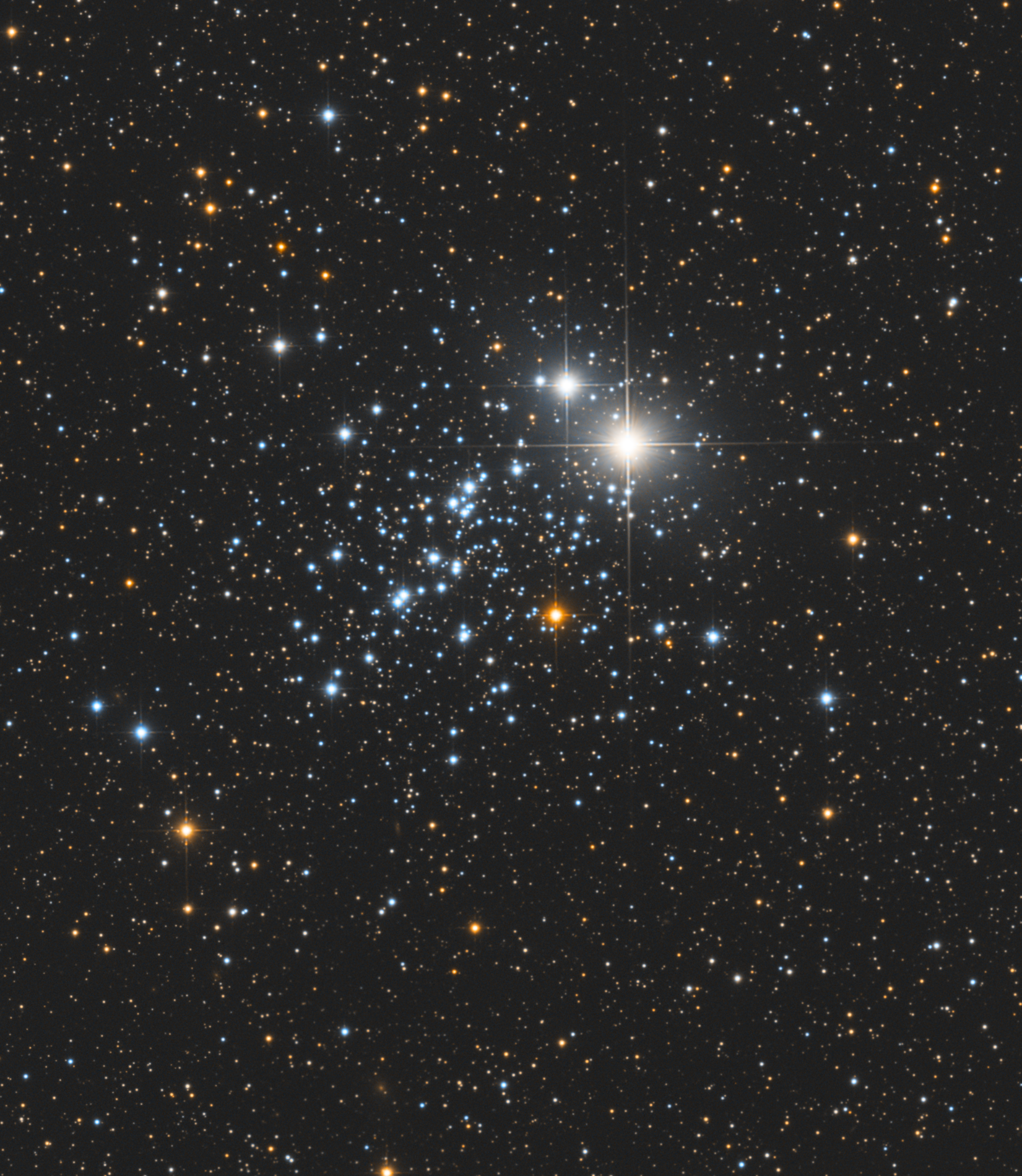
φ^{1} and φ^{2} Cassiopeiae are the two brightest stars in the field of open cluster NGC 457 (north is down).

φ Cassiopeiae appears among the stars of the open cluster NGC 457, which located at a distance of 7,800 light-years (2,400 pc), but it is uncertain whether φ Cas is a member of this cluster. φ Cas is generally treated as having five component stars, designated A to E in order of distance from the brightest star. The two components A and C are the brightest stars in the field of NGC 457; they are sometimes referred to as φ^{1} and φ^{2} Cassiopeiae. Component B is a 12th magnitude star 49" from φ^{1}.

Components D and E and both 10th magnitude B-type main sequence stars in the field of NGC 457, with component E only 42" from φ^{2}. Another three components are sometimes listed as components of the multiple system, although this is somewhat arbitrary with dozens of members of NGC 457 being found within a few arc-minutes.

The two supergiants, components A and C, share a similar space motion to the other stars in NGC 457, but their evolutionary status and brightness makes them unlikely members. Their Gaia Data Release 2 parallaxes are comparable to other stars in the cluster and consistent with the accepted distance of NGC 457, and component C has been given a 70% likelihood of being a member of the cluster.

== Properties ==
The primary component of the φ Cassiopeiae system is a very luminous yellow supergiant. Its absolute magnitude is comparable to some yellow hypergiants but it does not show the level of mass loss and instability that would qualify it as a hypergiant itself. Various model atmospheres all give a temperature around 7,300K, a low surface gravity, a radius around 250 R_{☉}, and a luminosity well over 100,000 L_{☉}. More uncertain is the mass, which would be expected to have been well over 25 M_{☉} initially, but much less now. Different authors have published values from 6 M_{☉} to 17 M_{☉}.

Component C is a relatively typical B class supergiant, 83,000 times the luminosity of the sun. It is a suspected variable and a suspected spectroscopic binary.

== See also ==
- Rho Cassiopeiae
