= Delta Cassiopeiae =

Star in constellation of Cassiopeia

δ Cassiopeiae
- Location of δ Cassiopeiae (circled)

Observation data Epoch J2000 Equinox ICRS
- Constellation: Cassiopeia
- Right ascension: 01^{h} 25^{m} 48.95147^{s}
- Declination: +60° 14′ 07.0225″
- Apparent magnitude (V): 2.68

Characteristics
- Spectral type: A5 IV
- U−B color index: +0.13
- B−V color index: +0.13
- Variable type: Algol?

Astrometry
Radial velocity (R_{v})	−6.7 km/s
Proper motion (μ)	RA: +296.57 mas/yr Dec.: −49.22 mas/yr
Parallax (π)	32.81±0.14 mas
Distance	99.4 ± 0.4 ly (30.5 ± 0.1 pc)
Absolute magnitude (M_{V})	+0.28

Details
Mass	2.49 M_{☉}
Radius	3.90 R_{☉}
Luminosity	72.88 L_{☉}
Surface gravity (log g)	3.1 cgs
Temperature	7,980 K
Metallicity [Fe/H]	−0.4 dex
Rotational velocity (v sin i)	123 km/s
Age	600 Myr

Other designations
- Ruchbah, Ksora, Rucba, Rucbar, 37 Cassiopeiae, BD+59°248, FK5 48, HD 8538, HIP 6686, HR 403, SAO 22268, WDS J01258+6014A

Database references
SIMBAD	data

Delta Cassiopeiae is an eclipsing binary star system in the northern circumpolar constellation of Cassiopeia. Its name is a Bayer designation that is Latinized from δ Cassiopeiae, and abbreviated Delta Cas or δ Cas. Based on parallax measurements taken during the Hipparcos mission, it is approximately 99.4 light-years (30.5 parsecs) from the Earth.

Delta Cassiopeiae is the primary or 'A' component of a multiple star system designated WDS J01258+6014. Delta Cassiopeiae's two components are therefore designated WDS J01258+6014 Aa and Ab. Aa is officially named Ruchbah /ˈrʌkbə/, the traditional name for the system.

== Nomenclature ==
δ Cassiopeiae (Latinised to Delta Cassiopeiae) is the star's Bayer designation. WDS J01258+6014A is its designation in the Washington Double Star Catalog.

It also bore the traditional names Ruchbah and Ksora; the former deriving from the Arabic word ركبة rukbah meaning "knee", and the latter appeared in a 1951 publication, Atlas Coeli (Skalnate Pleso Atlas of the Heavens) by Czech astronomer Antonín Bečvář. Professor Paul Kunitzch has been unable to find any clues as to the origin of the name. The star Alpha Sagittarii also bore the traditional name Ruchbah (as well as Rukbat). In 2016, the International Astronomical Union organized a Working Group on Star Names (WGSN) to catalogue and standardize proper names for stars. The WGSN approved the name Ruchbah for the component Delta Cassiopeiae Aa on 21 August 2016 and it is now so included in the List of IAU-approved Star Names (Alpha Sagittarii's primary was given the name Rukbat).

In Chinese, 閣道 (Gé Dào), meaning Flying Corridor, refers to an asterism consisting of Delta Cassiopeiae, Iota Cassiopeiae, Epsilon Cassiopeiae, Theta Cassiopeiae, Nu Cassiopeiae and Omicron Cassiopeiae. Consequently, the Chinese name for Delta Cassiopeiae itself is 閣道三 (Gé Dào sān, English: the Third Star of Flying Corridor).

== Properties ==
Delta Cassiopeiae is a possible eclipsing binary star system consisting of a pair of stars that orbit about each other over a period of 759 days. The combined apparent visual magnitude of the two stars is 2.68, making it readily observable with the naked eye. Eclipses have been reported with a period of 759 days, when the brightness drops by 0.07 magnitudes. Modern studies have shown no brightness variations greater than 0.01 magnitudes.

The primary member of the system (WDS J01258+6014 Aa) has a stellar classification of A5 IV, with the luminosity class of IV indicating that it has exhausted the hydrogen at its core and has begun to evolve through the subgiant phase into a giant star. It is calculated that it is 4% beyond the end of its main sequence lifetime, with an age of about 600 million years. It has expanded to about 3.9 times the Sun's radius.

An excess infrared emission has been observed at a wavelength of 60 μm, which suggests the presence of a circumstellar debris disk. This emission can be characterized by heat radiated from dust at a temperature of 85 K, which corresponds to an orbital radius of 88 Astronomical Units, or 88 times the distance of the Earth from the Sun. For comparison, the region of the remote Kuiper belt in the Solar System extends from 30–50 AU.

The Washington Double Star Catalog lists a 12th magnitude companion 110″ away. It is an unrelated background object.
