= 7 Persei =

Star in the constellation Perseus

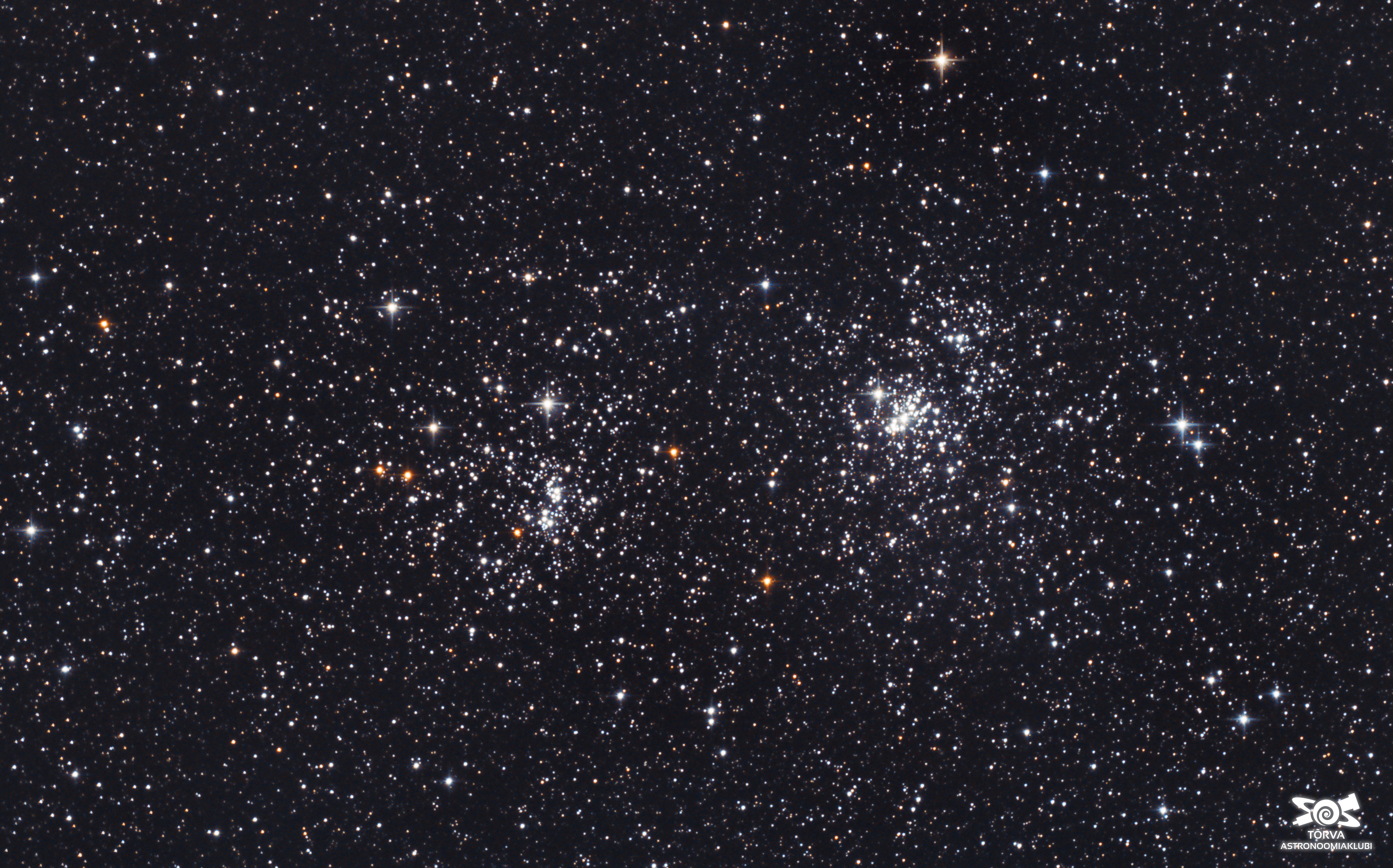
- Location of 7 Persei (circled)

Observation data Epoch J2000.0 Equinox ICRS
- Constellation: Perseus
- Right ascension: 02^{h} 18^{m} 04.58456^{s}
- Declination: +57° 30′ 58.7594″
- Apparent magnitude (V): 5.99

Characteristics
- Evolutionary stage: horizontal branch
- Spectral type: G7 III
- B−V color index: 1.039±0.007

Astrometry
Radial velocity (R_{v})	−12.5±0.3 km/s
Proper motion (μ)	RA: −13.409 mas/yr Dec.: −1.338 mas/yr
Parallax (π)	4.1956±0.0322 mas
Distance	777 ± 6 ly (238 ± 2 pc)
Absolute magnitude (M_{V})	−1.22

Details
Mass	3.84 M_{☉}
Radius	24 R_{☉}
Luminosity	316 L_{☉}
Surface gravity (log g)	2.44 cgs
Temperature	4,974 K
Metallicity [Fe/H]	−0.11 dex
Rotational velocity (v sin i)	11.5 km/s
Age	191 Myr

Other designations
- 7 Per, BD+56°486, HD 13994, HIP 10729, HR 662, SAO 23149

Database references
SIMBAD	data

7 Persei is a star in the constellation Perseus, located 777 light years away from the Sun. While the star bears the Bayer designation Chi Persei, it is not to be confused with the entire cluster NGC 884, commonly referred to as Chi Persei. It is faintly visible to the naked eye as a dim, yellow-hued star with an apparent visual magnitude of 5.99. This object is moving closer to the Earth with a heliocentric radial velocity of −12.5 km/s.

This is an evolved giant star with a stellar classification of G7 III, most likely (93% chance) on the horizontal branch. At the age of 191 million years, it has 3.84 times the mass of the Sun but has expanded to 24 times the Sun's radius. The star is radiating 316 times the Sun's luminosity from its enlarged photosphere at an effective temperature of 4,974 K.
