= Cassiopeia (constellation) =

Constellation in the northern celestial hemisphere

- Constellation
- List of stars in Cassiopeia
- Abbreviation: Cas
- Genitive: Cassiopeiae
- Pronunciation: /ˌkæsiəˈpiːə, -sioʊ-/ Cássiopéia, esp. for the constellation also /ˌkæsiˈoʊpiə/ Cássiópeia; genitive /ˌkæsiəˈpiːaɪ, -sioʊ-, -iː/
- Symbolism: the Seated Queen
- Right ascension: 22^{h} 57^{m} 04.5897^{s}–03^{h} 41^{m} 14.0997^{s}
- Declination: 77.6923447°–48.6632690°
- Area: 598 sq. deg. (25th)
- Main stars: 5
- Bayer/Flamsteed stars: 53
- Stars brighter than 3.00^{m}: 4
- Stars within 10.00 pc (32.62 ly): 7
- Brightest star: α Cas (Schedar) (Note: γ Cas is variable and occasionally brighter than α.) (2.24^{m})
- Nearest star: η Cas (Achird)
- Messier objects: 2
- Meteor showers: Perseids
- Bordering constellations: Camelopardalis; Cepheus; Lacerta; Andromeda; Perseus
- Visible at latitudes between +90° and −12°. Best visible at 21:00 (9 p.m.) during the month of November.

Cassiopeia is a constellation and asterism in the northern sky named after the vain queen Cassiopeia, mother of Andromeda, in Greek mythology, who boasted about her unrivaled beauty. Cassiopeia was one of the 48 constellations listed by the 2nd-century Greek astronomer Ptolemy, and it remains one of the 88 modern constellations today. It is easily recognizable due to its distinctive 'W' shape, formed by five bright stars.

Cassiopeia is located in the northern sky and from latitudes above 34°N it is visible year-round. In the (sub)tropics it can be seen at its clearest from September to early November, and at low southern, tropical, latitudes of less than 25°S it can be seen, seasonally, low in the North.

At magnitude 2.2, Alpha Cassiopeiae, or Schedar, is the brightest star in Cassiopeia. The constellation hosts some of the most luminous stars known, including the yellow hypergiants Rho Cassiopeiae and V509 Cassiopeiae and white hypergiant 6 Cassiopeiae. In 1572, Tycho Brahe's supernova flared brightly in Cassiopeia. Cassiopeia A is a supernova remnant and the brightest extrasolar radio source in the sky at frequencies above 1 GHz. Fourteen star systems have been found to have exoplanets, one of which – HD 219134 – is thought to host six planets. A rich section of the Milky Way runs through Cassiopeia, containing a number of open clusters, young luminous galactic disc stars, and nebulae. IC 10 is an irregular galaxy that is the closest known starburst galaxy and the only one in the Local Group of galaxies.

== Mythology ==
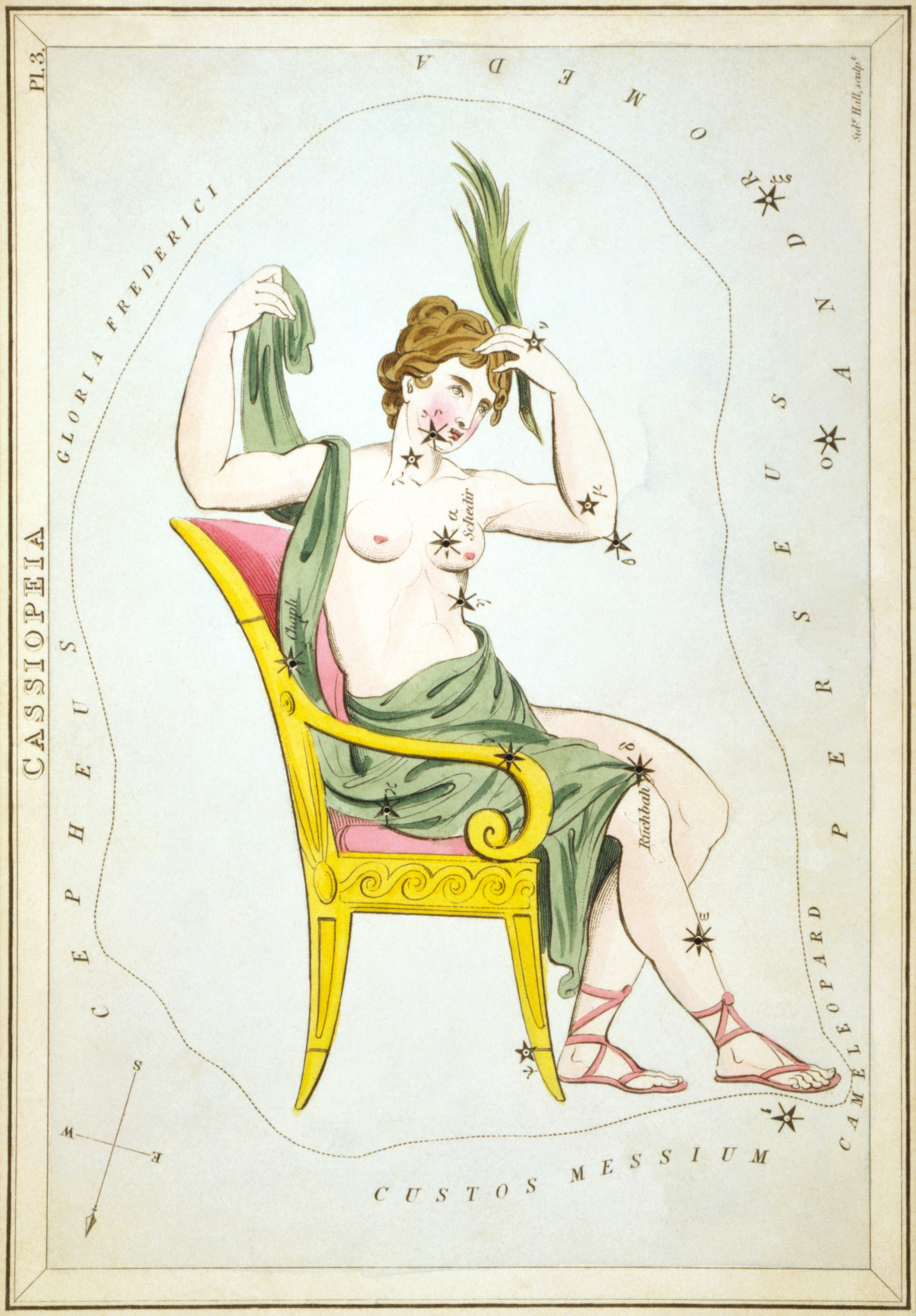
Cassiopeia in her chair, as depicted in Urania's Mirror

The constellation is named after Cassiopeia, the queen of Aethiopia. Cassiopeia was the wife of King Cepheus of Aethiopia and mother of Princess Andromeda. Cepheus and Cassiopeia were placed next to each other among the stars, along with Andromeda. She was placed in the sky as a punishment after enraging Poseidon with the boast that her daughter Andromeda was more beautiful than the Nereids or, alternatively, that she herself was more beautiful than the sea nymphs. She was forced to wheel around the north celestial pole on her throne, spending half of her time clinging to it so she does not fall off, and Poseidon decreed that Andromeda should be bound to a rock as prey for the monster Cetus. Andromeda was then rescued by the hero Perseus, whom she later married.

Cassiopeia has been variously portrayed throughout her history as a constellation. In Persia, she was drawn by al-Sufi as a queen holding a staff with a crescent moon in her right hand, wearing a crown, as well as a two-humped camel. In France, she was portrayed as having a marble throne and a palm leaf in her left hand, holding her robe in her right hand. This depiction is from Augustin Royer's 1679 atlas.

In Chinese astronomy, the stars forming the constellation Cassiopeia are found among three areas: the Purple Forbidden enclosure (紫微垣, Zǐ Wēi Yuán), the Black Tortoise of the North (北方玄武, Běi Fāng Xuán Wǔ), and the White Tiger of the West (西方白虎, Xī Fāng Bái Hǔ).

The Chinese astronomers saw several figures in what is modern-day Cassiopeia. Kappa, Eta, and Mu Cassiopeiae formed a constellation called the Bridge of the Kings; when seen along with Alpha and Beta Cassiopeiae, they formed the great chariot Wang-Liang. The charioteer's whip was represented by Gamma Cassiopeiae, sometimes called "Tsih", the Chinese word for "whip".

In Hindu mythology, Cassiopeia was associated with the mythological figure Sharmishtha (Sanskrit: शर्मिष्ठा)– the daughter of the great Devil (Daitya) King Vrishparva and a friend to Devayani (Sanskrit: देवयानी) (Andromeda).

In Welsh mythology Llys Dôn (literally "The Court of Dôn") is the traditional Welsh name for the constellation. At least three of Dôn's children also have astronomical associations: Caer Gwydion ("The fortress of Gwydion") is the traditional Welsh name for the Milky Way, and Caer Arianrhod ("The Fortress of Arianrhod") being the constellation of Corona Borealis.

In the 17th century, various Biblical figures were depicted in the stars of Cassiopeia. These included Bathsheba, Solomon's mother; Deborah, an Old Testament prophet; and Mary Magdalene, a follower of Jesus.

A figure called the "Tinted Hand" also appeared in the stars of Cassiopeia in some Arabic atlases. This is variously said to represent a woman's hand dyed red with henna, as well as the bloodied hand of Muhammad's daughter Fatima. The hand is made up of the stars α Cas, β Cas, γ Cas, δ Cas, ε Cas, and η Cas. The arm is made up of the stars α Per, γ Per, δ Per, ε Per, η Per, and ν Per.

Another Arabic constellation that incorporated the stars of Cassiopeia was the Camel. Its head was composed of Lambda, Kappa, Iota, and Phi Andromedae; its hump was Beta Cassiopeiae; its body was the rest of Cassiopeia, and the legs were composed of stars in Perseus and Andromeda.

Other cultures see a hand or moose antlers in the pattern. These include the Sámi, for whom the W of Cassiopeia forms an elk antler. The Chukchi of Siberia similarly saw the five main stars as five reindeer stags.

The people of the Marshall Islands saw Cassiopeia as part of a great porpoise constellation. The main stars of Cassiopeia make its tail, Andromeda and Triangulum form its body, and Aries makes its head. In Hawaii, Alpha, Beta, and Gamma Cassiopeiae were named. Alpha Cassiopeiae was called Poloahilani, Beta Cassiopeiae was called Polula, and Gamma Cassiopeiae was called Mulehu. The people of Pukapuka saw the figure of Cassiopeia as a distinct constellation called Na Taki-tolu-a-Mataliki.

== Characteristics ==
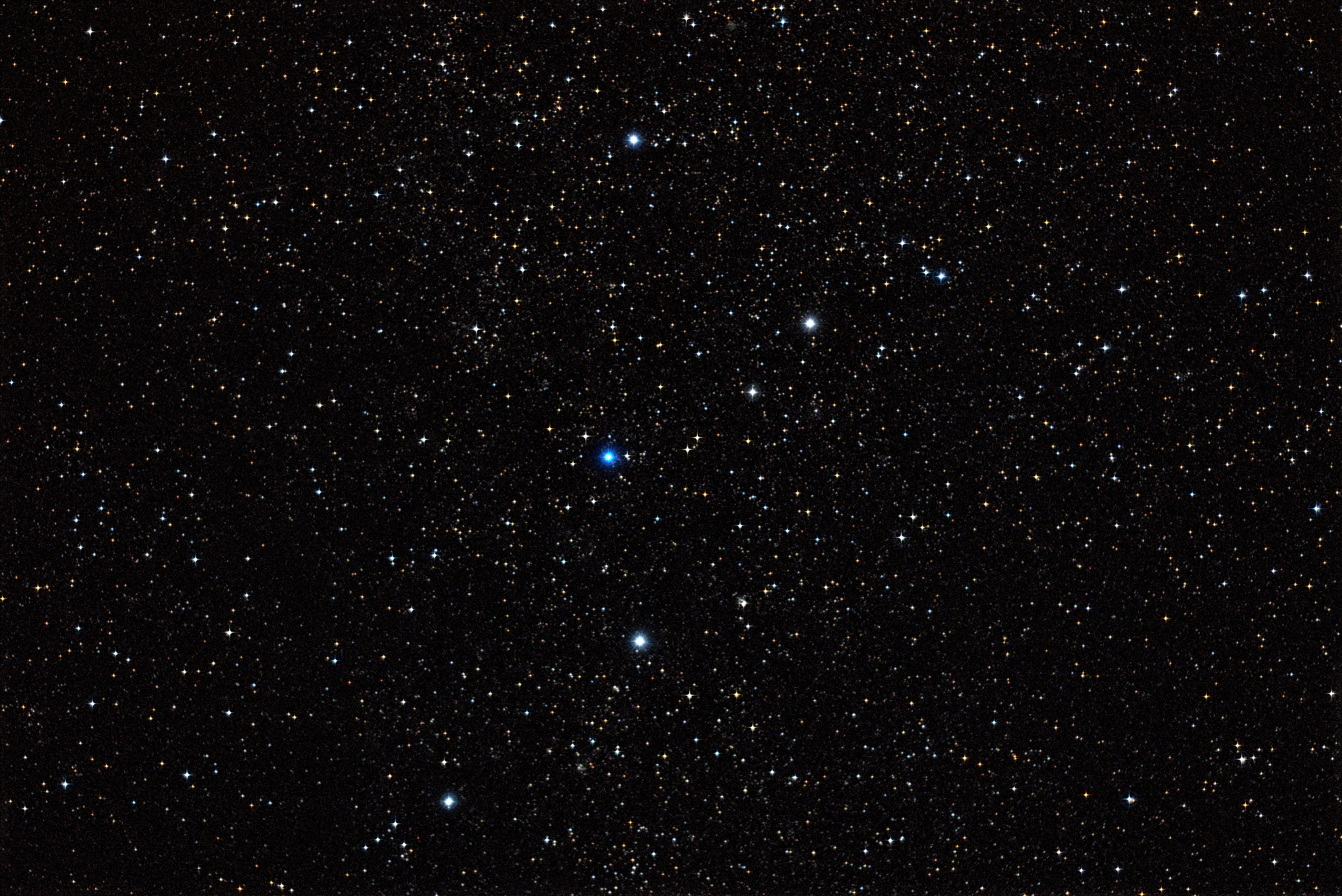
Cassiopeia in the night sky

Cassiopeia, animation of all stars from 4th to 10th magnitude

Cassiopeia had a supernova, Cassiopeia A, SN 1572.

Covering 598.4 square degrees and hence 1.451% of the sky, Cassiopeia ranks 25th of the 88 constellations in area. It is bordered by Cepheus to the north and west, Andromeda to the south and west, Perseus to the southeast and Camelopardalis to the east, and also shares a short border with Lacerta to the west.

The three-letter abbreviation for the constellation, as adopted by the International Astronomical Union in 1922, is "Cas". The official constellation boundaries, as set by Belgian astronomer Eugène Delporte in 1930, (Note: Delporte had proposed standardising the constellation boundaries to the International Astronomical Union, who had agreed and gave him the lead role) are defined by a polygon of 30 segments. In the equatorial coordinate system, the right ascension coordinates of these borders lie between 00^{h} 27^{m} 03^{s} and 23^{h} 41^{m} 06^{s}, while the declination coordinates are between 77.69° and 46.68°. Its position in the Northern Celestial Hemisphere means that the whole constellation is visible to observers north of 12°S. (Note: While parts of the constellation technically rise above the horizon to observers between the latitudes of 12°S and 43°S, stars within a few degrees of the horizon are to all intents and purposes unobservable.) High in the northern sky, it is circumpolar (that is, it never sets in the night sky) to viewers in the British Isles, Canada and the northern United States.

== Features ==
=== Stars ===
The constellation Cassiopeia as it can be seen by the naked eye from a northern location

The German cartographer Johann Bayer used the Greek letters Alpha through Omega, and then A and B, to label the most prominent 26 stars in the constellation. Upsilon was later found to be two stars and labelled Upsilon^{1} and Upsilon^{2} by John Flamsteed. B Cassiopeiae was in fact the supernova known as Tycho's Supernova. Within the constellation's borders, there are 157 stars brighter than or equal to apparent magnitude 6.5. (Note: Objects of magnitude 6.5 are among the faintest visible to the unaided eye in suburban-rural transition night skies.)

==== 'W' asterism ====
The five brightest stars of Cassiopeia – Alpha, Beta, Gamma, Delta, and Epsilon Cassiopeiae – form the characteristic W-shaped asterism. All five are prominent naked eye stars, three are noticeably variable, and a fourth is a suspected low amplitude variable. The asterism is oriented as a W when below Polaris during northern spring and summer nights. In northern winter, and when seen from southern latitudes, it is "above" Polaris (i.e. closer to the zenith) and the W appears inverted.

Alpha Cassiopeiae, traditionally called Schedar (from the Arabic Al Sadr, "the breast"), is commonly mistaken as a four-star system, but is actually a single star with three physically distant optical components. The primary dominates, an orange-hued giant of magnitude 2.2, 228±2 light-years from Earth. With a luminosity of around 771 times that of the Sun, it has swollen and cooled after exhausting its core hydrogen over its 100 to 200 million-year lifespan, spending much of it as a blue-white B-type main-sequence star. Magnitude 8.9 yellow dwarf companion (B) is widely separated; companions (C and D) are closer and magnitudes 13 and 14 respectively.

Beta Cassiopeiae, or Caph (meaning "hand"), is a white-hued star of magnitude 2.3, 54.7±0.3 light-years from Earth. Around 1.2 billion years old, it has used up its core hydrogen and begun expanding and cooling off the main sequence. It is around 1.9 times as massive as the Sun, and around 21.3 times as luminous. Rotating at about 92% of its critical speed, Caph completes a full rotation every 1.12 days. This is giving the star an oblate spheroid shape with an equatorial bulge that is 24% larger than the polar radius. It is a Delta Scuti variable with a small amplitude and period of 2.5 hours.

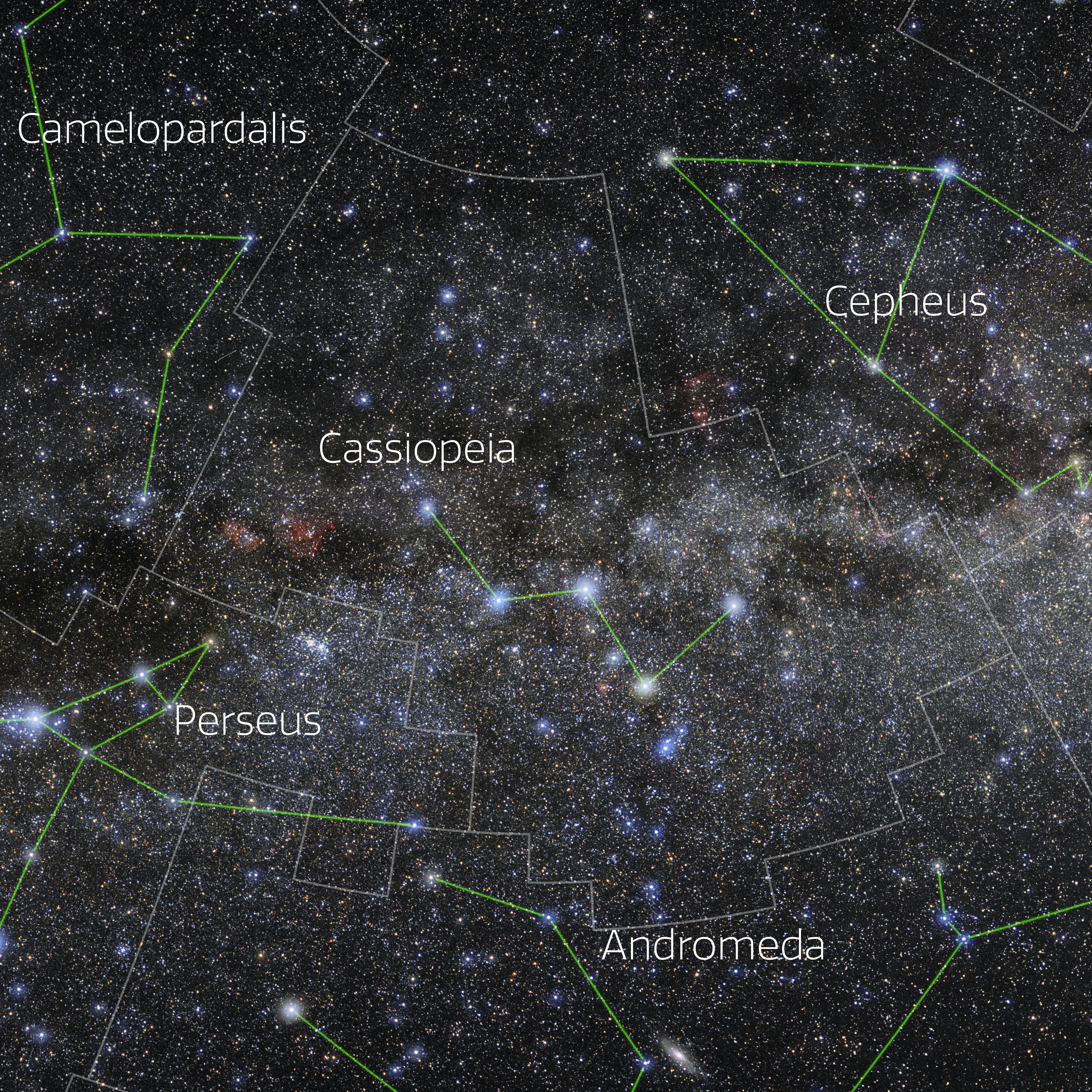
The constellation Cassiopeia showing the IAU boundaries, the constellation stick figure, and labels for its brightest stars. Astrophotograph by Eckhard Slawik, from NOIRLab's 88 Constellations project.

Gamma Cassiopeiae now known as Tiansi is the prototype Gamma Cassiopeiae variable star, a type of variable star that has a variable disc of material flung off by the high rotation rate of the star. Gamma Cassiopeiae has a minimum magnitude of 3.0 and a maximum magnitude of 1.6, but is generally near magnitude 2.2, with unpredictable fades and brightenings. It is a spectroscopic binary, with an orbital period of 203.59 days and a companion with a calculated mass about the same as the Sun. However, no direct evidence of this companion has been found, leading to speculation that it might be a white dwarf or other degenerate star. It is 550±10 light-years from Earth.

Delta Cassiopeiae, also known as Ruchbah or Rukbat, meaning "knee," is a possible Algol-type eclipsing binary star with a maximum brightness of magnitude 2.7. It has been reported to show eclipses of less than 0.1 magnitudes with a period of 2 years and 1 month, but this has never been confirmed. It is 99.4±0.4 light-years from Earth. Delta Cassiopeiae was the star used by Jean Picard in 1669 to establish the length on the Earth's surface corresponding to one degree, and hence the radius of the Earth.

Epsilon Cassiopeiae also known as Segin has an apparent magnitude of 3.3. Located 410±20 light-years from Earth, it is a hot blue-white star of spectral type B3 III with a surface temperature of 15,680 K. It is 6.5 times as massive and 4.2 times as wide as the Sun, and belongs to a class of stars known as Be stars—rapidly spinning stars that throw off a ring or shell of matter.

==== Fainter stars ====
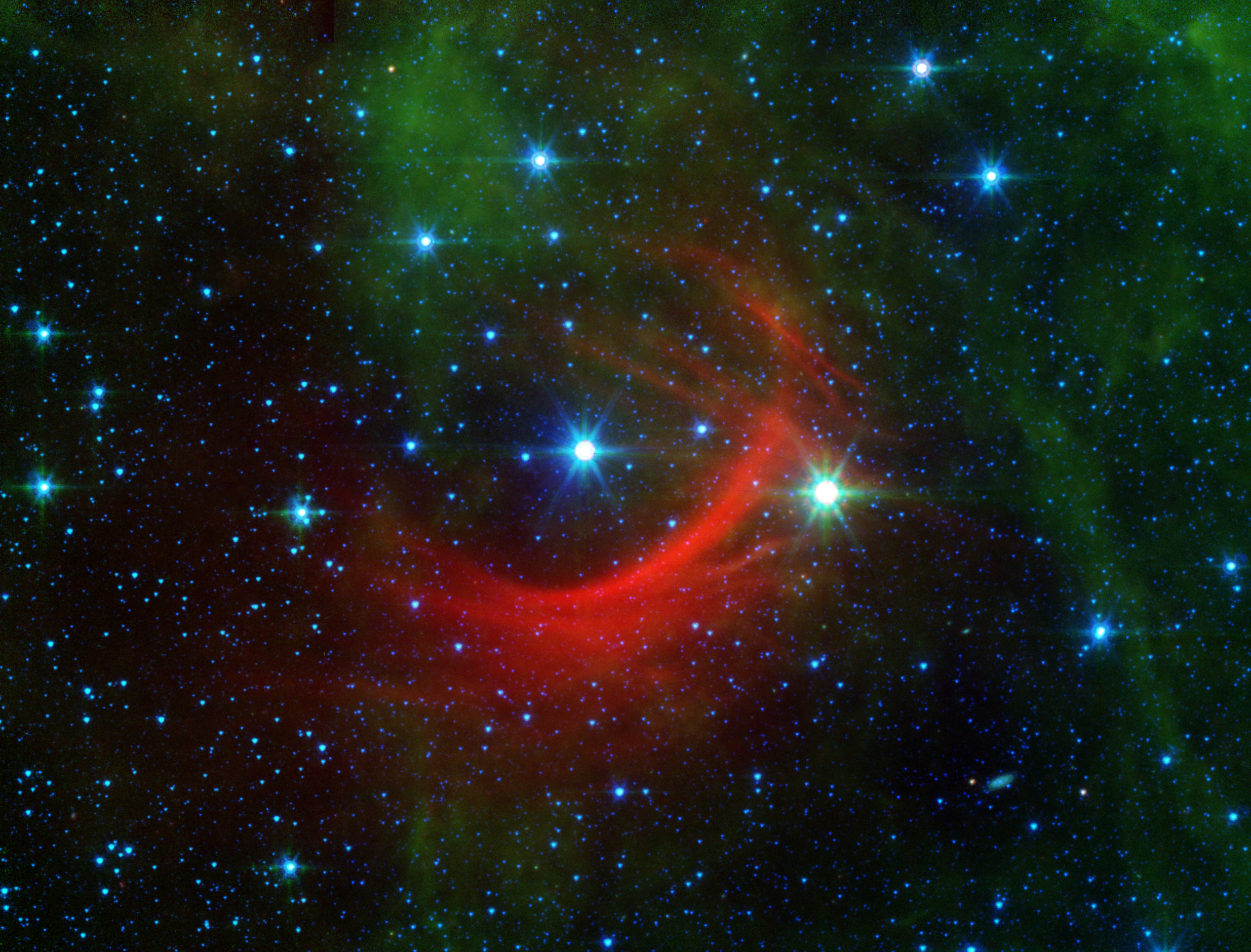
Kappa Cassiopeiae and its bow shock. Spitzer infrared image (NASA/JPL-Caltech)

The next seven brightest stars in Cassiopeia are also all confirmed or suspected variable stars, including 50 Cassiopeiae (Gang) which was not given a Greek letter by Bayer and is a suspected variable with a very small amplitude. Zeta Cassiopeiae (Fulu) is a suspected slowly pulsating B-type star. Kappa Cassiopeiae (Cexing) is a blue supergiant of spectral type BC0.7Ia that is some 302,000 times as luminous as the Sun and has 33 times its diameter. It is a runaway star, moving at around 2.5 million mph relative to its neighbors (1,100 kilometers per second). Its magnetic field and wind of particles creates a visible bow shock 4 light-years ahead of it, colliding with the diffuse, and usually invisible, interstellar gas and dust. The dimensions of the bow shock are vast: around 12 light-years long and 1.8 light-years wide. Theta Cassiopeiae, named Marfak, is a suspected variable star whose brightness changes by less than a tenth of a magnitude. Iota Cassiopeiae is a triple star 142 light-years from Earth. The primary is a white-hued star of magnitude 4.5 and an α^{2} Canum Venaticorum variable, the secondary is a yellow-hued star of magnitude 6.9, and the tertiary is a star of magnitude 8.4. The primary and secondary are close together but the primary and tertiary are widely separated. Omicron Cassiopeiae is a triple star and the primary is another γ Cassiopeiae variable.

Eta Cassiopeiae (Achird) is the nearest star in Cassiopeia, located some 19.13 ly away. It is a binary star made up of a G-dwarf star similar to the Sun, of apparent magnitude 3.45, and a K-dwarf star of apparent magnitude 7.51. It is visually located between Alpha and Gamma Cassiopeiae and are one of the nearest G-type / K-type stars to Earth.

Sigma Cassiopeiae is a binary star 1500 light-years from Earth. It has a green-hued primary of magnitude 5.0 and a blue-hued secondary of magnitude 7.3. Psi Cassiopeiae is a triple star 193 light-years from Earth. The primary is an orange-hued giant star of magnitude 4.7 and the secondary is a close pair of stars that appears to be of magnitude 9.0.

Rho Cassiopeiae is a semi-regular pulsating variable yellow hypergiant, and is among the most luminous stars in the galaxy at approximately 500,000 L_{☉}. It has a minimum magnitude of 6.2 and a maximum magnitude of 4.1; its period is approximately 320 days. It has around 450 times the Sun's diameter and 17 times its mass, having begun life 45 times as massive as the Sun. Rho Cassiopeiae is about 10,000 light-years from Earth. Cassiopeia includes V509 Cassiopeiae, a second example of the extremely rare yellow hypergiants, which is around 400,000 times as luminous as the Sun and 14 times as massive, as well as 6 Cassiopeiae which is a hotter white hypergiant. It also hosts the red supergiant PZ Cassiopeiae, which is one of the largest known stars with an estimate of 1,190–1,940 R_{☉} and is also a semiregular variable. Between 240,000 and 270,000 times as luminous as the Sun, it is around 9,160 light-years distant from Earth.

AO Cassiopeiae is a binary system composed of an O8 main sequence star and an O9.2 bright giant that respectively weigh anywhere between 20.30 and 57.75 times and 14.8 and 31.73 times the mass of the Sun. The two massive stars are so close to each other they distort each other into egg-shapes.

Tycho Brahe's supernova was visible within Cassiopeia, and the star Tycho G is suspected of being the donor of the material that triggered that explosion.

=== Deep-sky objects ===
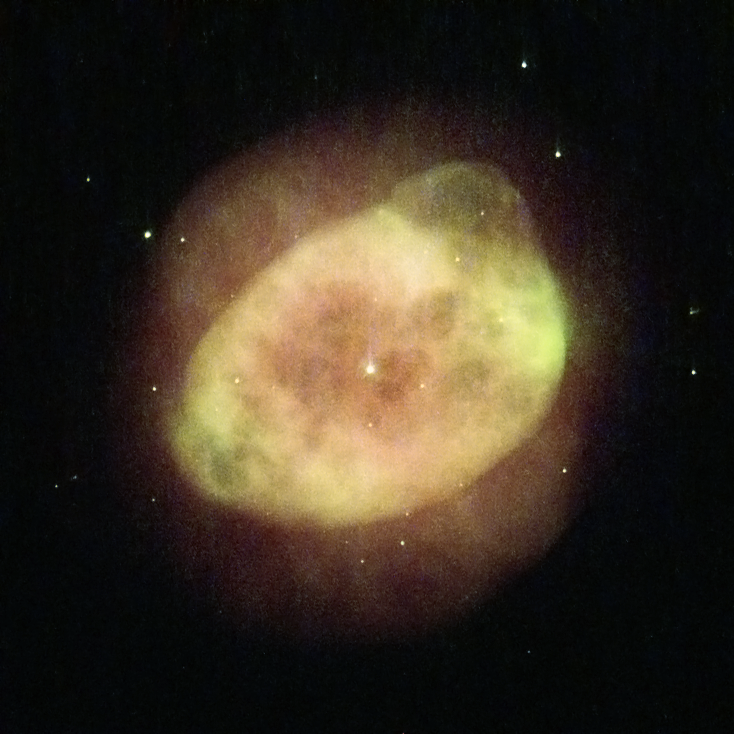
Planetary nebula IC 289 is a cloud of ionised gas being pushed out into space by the remnants of the star's core.

A rich section of the Milky Way runs through Cassiopeia, stretching from Perseus towards Cygnus, and it contains a number of open clusters, young luminous galactic disc stars, and nebulae.

The Heart Nebula and the Soul Nebula are two neighboring emission nebulae about 7,500 light-years away.

Two Messier objects, M52 (NGC 7654) and M103 (NGC 581), are located in Cassiopeia; both are open clusters. M52, once described as a "kidney-shaped" cluster, contains approximately 100 stars and is 4,600 light-years from Earth. Its most prominent member is an orange-hued star of magnitude 8.0 near the cluster's edge. M103 is far poorer than M52, with only about 25 stars included. It is also more distant, between 8000 and 9500 light-years from Earth. Its most prominent member is actually a closer, superimposed double star; it consists of a 7th-magnitude primary and 10th-magnitude secondary.

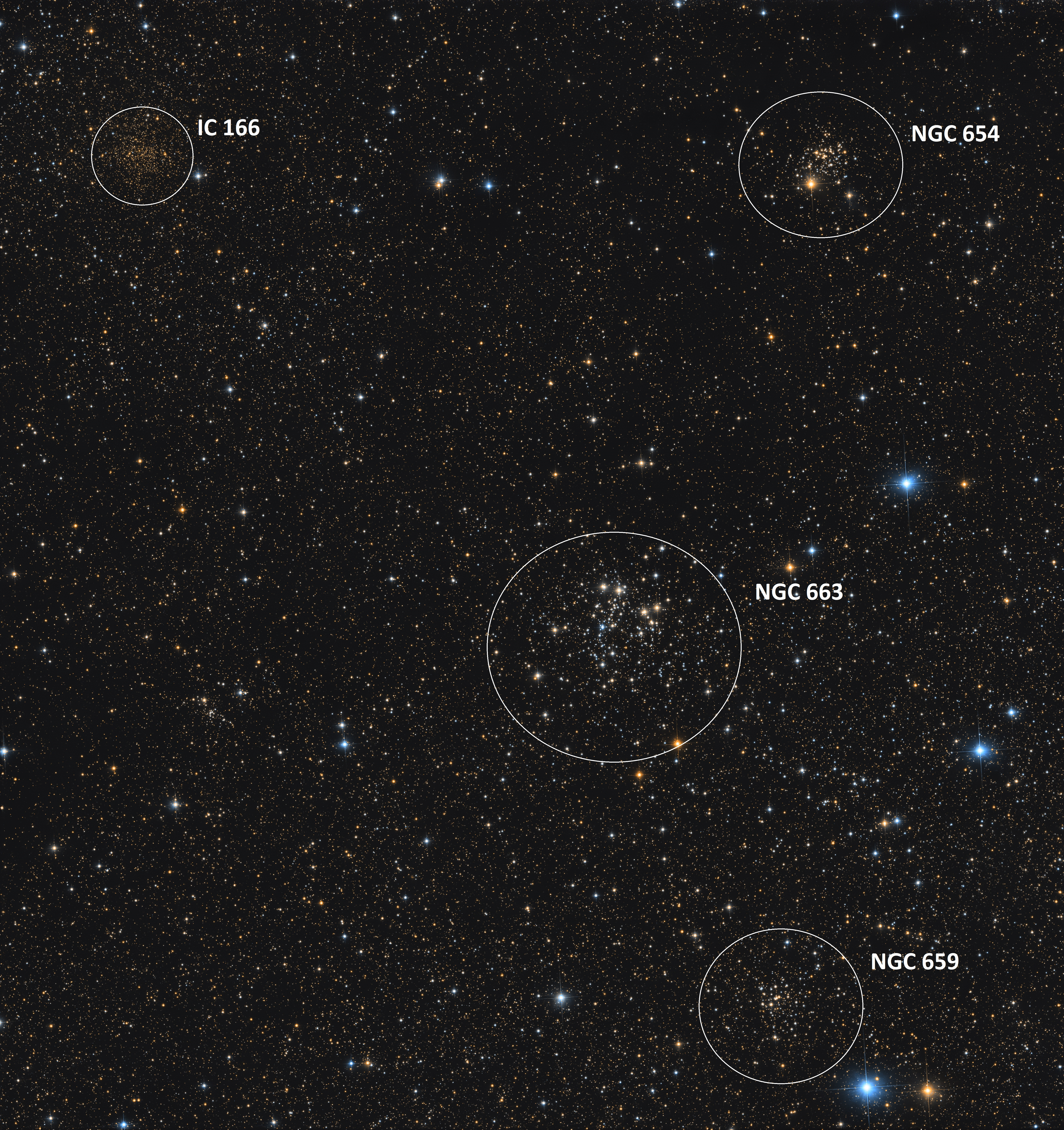
Four clusters in Cassiopeia. IC 166, NGC 654, NGC 663, and NGC 659

The other prominent open clusters in Cassiopeia are NGC 457 and NGC 663, both of which have about 80 stars. NGC 457 is looser, and its brightest member is Phi Cassiopeiae, a white-hued supergiant star of magnitude 5.0. However, it is uncertain whether Phi Cassiopeiae is part of the open cluster or not. The stars of NGC 457, arrayed in chains, are approximately 10,000 light-years from Earth. NGC 663 is both closer, at 8200 light-years from Earth, and larger, at 0.25 degrees in diameter.

There are two supernova remnants in Cassiopeia. The first, designated 3C 10 or just Tycho's Supernova Remnant, is the aftermath of the supernova called Tycho's Star. It was observed in 1572 by Tycho Brahe and now exists as a bright object in the radio spectrum. Within the 'W' asterism formed by Cassiopeia's five major stars lies Cassiopeia A (Cas A). It is the remnant of a supernova that took place approximately 300 years ago (as observed now from Earth; it is 10,000 light-years away), and has the distinction of being the strongest radio source observable outside the Solar System. It was perhaps observed as a faint star in 1680 by John Flamsteed. It was also the subject of the first image returned by the Chandra X-Ray Observatory in the late 1990s. The shell of matter expelled from the star is moving at 4,000 kilometres (2,500 mi) per second; it has a temperature of 30,000,000 K on average.

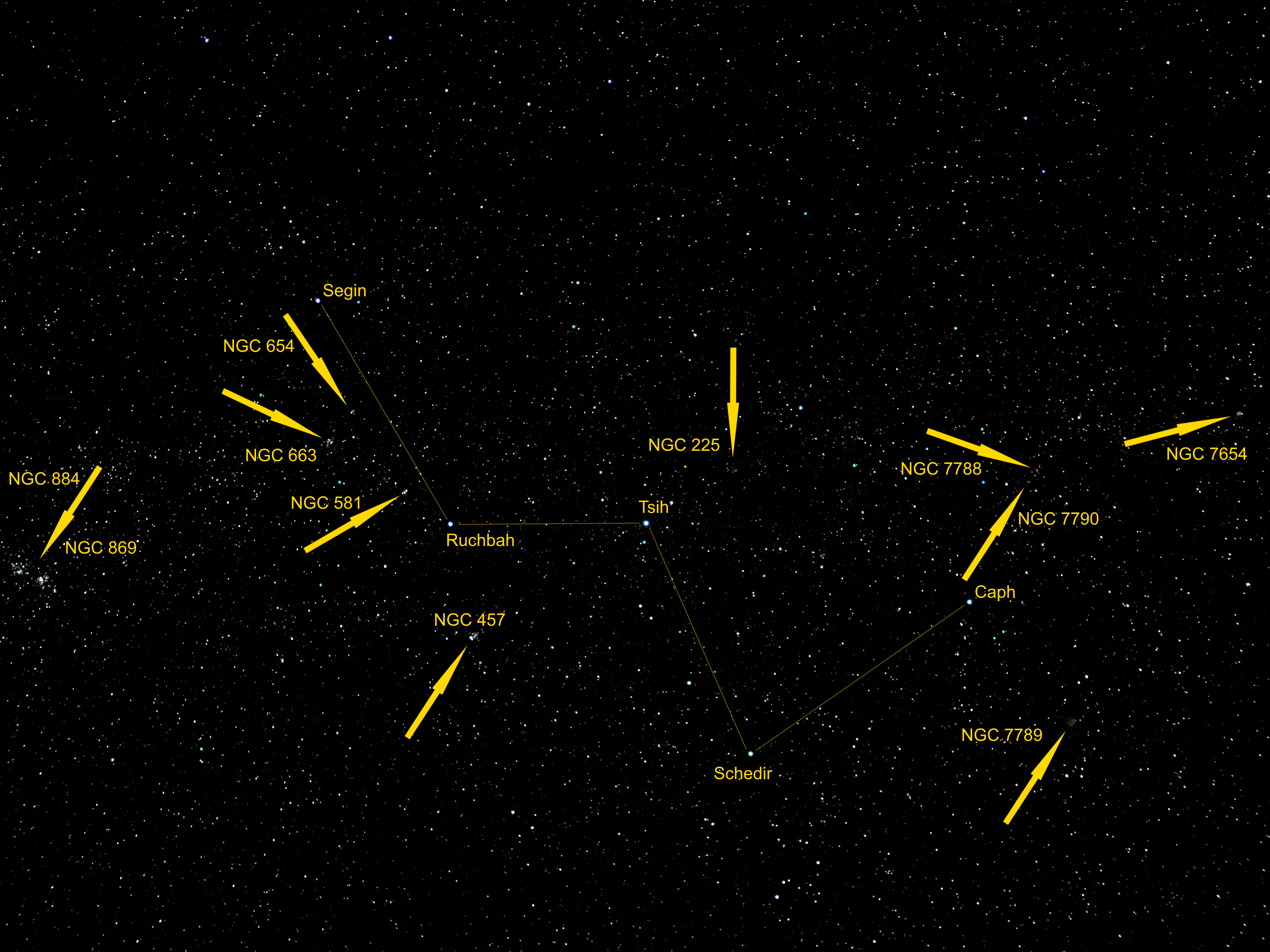
Cassiopeia showing the double cluster χ and h Persei as well as the clusters NGC 654, NGC 663, M103, NGC 457, NGC 225, NGC 7788, NGC 7790, NGC 7789 and M52

NGC 457 is another open cluster in Cassiopeia, also called the E.T. Cluster, the Owl Cluster, and Caldwell 13. The cluster was discovered in 1787 by William Herschel. It has an overall magnitude of 6.4 and is approximately 10,000 light-years from Earth, lying in the Perseus Arm of the Milky Way. However, its most prominent member, the double star Phi Cassiopeiae, is far closer – between 1000 and 4000 light-years away. NGC 457 is fairly rich; it is a Shapley class e and Trumpler class I 3 r cluster. It is concentrated towards its center and detached from the star field. It contains more than 100 stars, which vary widely in brightness.

Two members of the Local Group of galaxies are in Cassiopeia. NGC 185 is a magnitude 9.2 elliptical galaxy of type E0, 2 million light-years away. Slightly dimmer and more distant NGC 147 is a magnitude 9.3 elliptical galaxy, like NGC 185 it is an elliptical of type E0; it is 2.3 million light-years from Earth. Though they do not appear in Andromeda, both dwarf galaxies are gravitationally bound to the far larger Andromeda Galaxy.

IC 10 is an irregular galaxy that is the closest known starburst galaxy and the only one in the Local Group of galaxies.

Cassiopeia also contains part of the closest galaxy group to our Local Group, the IC 342/Maffei Group. The galaxies Maffei 1 and Maffei 2 are located just to the south of the Heart and Soul nebulae. As a result of this location in the Zone of Avoidance, both are surprisingly faint despite both being within 10 million light-years away (Maffei 2 is below the range of most amateur telescopes).

=== Meteor showers ===
The December Phi Cassiopeiids are a recently discovered early December meteor shower that radiates from Cassiopeia. Phi Cassiopeiids are very slow, with an entry velocity of approximately 16.7 kilometers per second. The shower's parent body is Biela's Comet, although the identity of the parent body was unknown for a number of years.

== See also ==
- Star-forming regions of Cassiopeia
