= Nu Cassiopeiae =

B-type star in the constellation Cassiopeia

- Location of ν Cassiopeiae (circled)

Observation data Epoch J2000.0 Equinox J2000.0 (ICRS)
- Constellation: Cassiopeia
- Right ascension: 00^{h} 43^{m} 28.07045^{s}
- Declination: +47° 01′ 28.3694″
- Apparent magnitude (V): +4.89

Characteristics
- Evolutionary stage: main sequence
- Spectral type: B9 III or B8 V
- U−B color index: −0.43
- B−V color index: −0.11

Astrometry
Radial velocity (R_{v})	+9.0±4.2 km/s
Proper motion (μ)	RA: +29.453 mas/yr Dec.: −8.152 mas/yr
Parallax (π)	9.1537±0.2122 mas
Distance	356 ± 8 ly (109 ± 3 pc)
Absolute magnitude (M_{V})	−0.60

Details
Mass	3.6 M_{☉}
Radius	2.8 R_{☉}
Luminosity	194 L_{☉}
Surface gravity (log g)	4.026±0.035 cgs
Temperature	13,268±150 K
Rotational velocity (v sin i)	134±17 km/s
Age	197 Myr

Other designations
- ν Cas, 25 Cas, BD+50°147, HD 4636, HIP 3801, HR 223, SAO 21729

Database references
SIMBAD	data

Nu Cassiopeiae is a solitary star in the northern constellation of Cassiopeia. Its name is a Bayer designation that is Latinized from ν Cassiopeiae, and abbreviated Nu Cas or ν Cas. With an apparent visual magnitude of +4.89, it is a faint star but visible to the naked eye. Based upon an annual parallax shift of 9.15 mas as seen from Earth, this star is located around 356 light-years (109 pc) from the Sun. It is drifting further away with a line of sight velocity component of roughly +9 km/s.

Cowley et al. (1969) catalogued this star with a stellar classification of B9 III, indicating it has the spectrum of an evolved B-type giant star. However, Palmer et al. (1968) assigned it a class of B8 V, which would instead suggest it is an ordinary B-type main-sequence star.

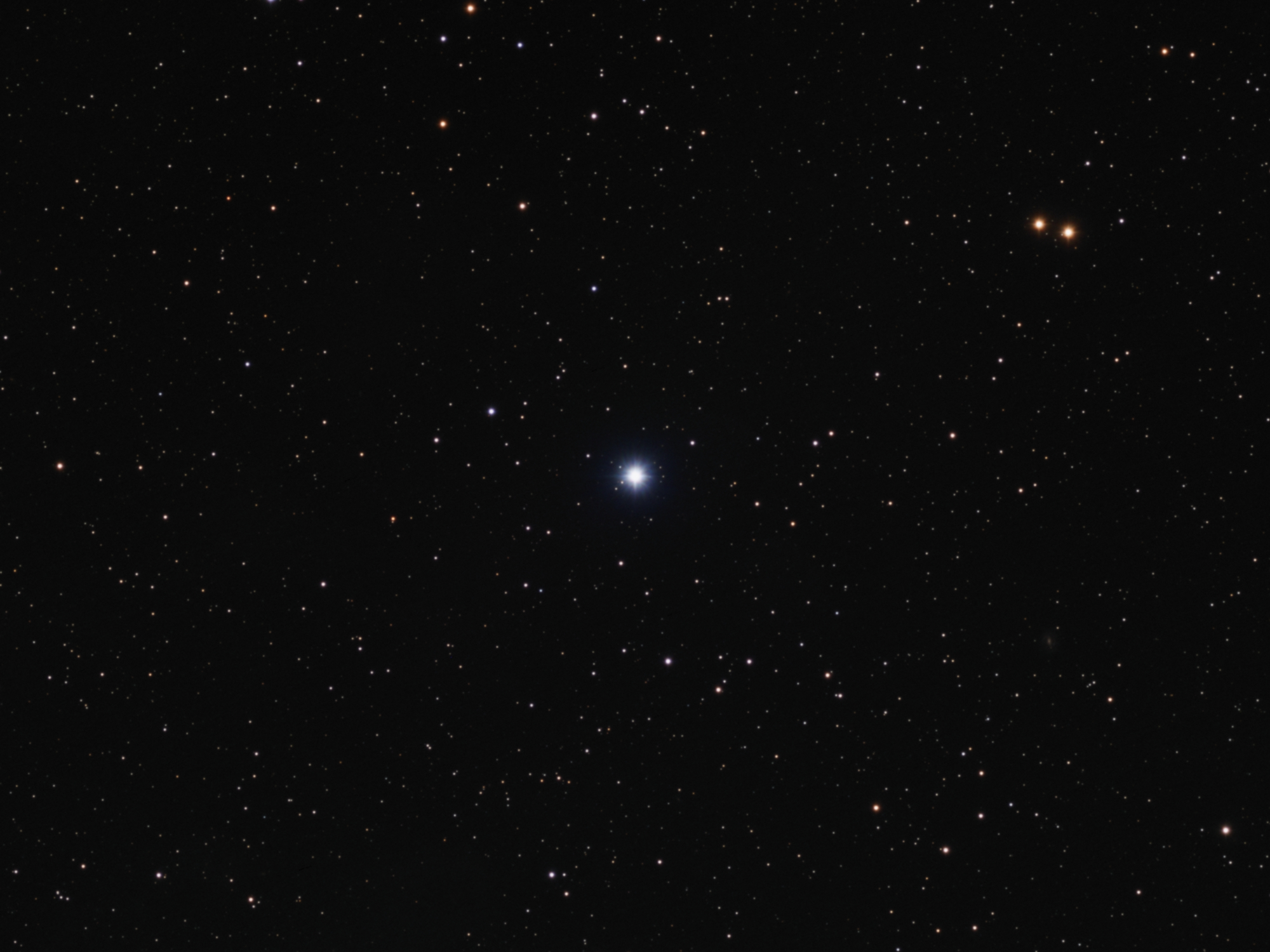
ν Cassiopeiae in optical light
