= Iota Cassiopeiae =

Variable star in the constellation Cassiopeiae

ι Cassiopeiae
- Location of ι Cassiopeiae (circled)

Observation data Epoch J2000.0 Equinox ICRS
- Constellation: Cassiopeia
- ι Cas A
- Right ascension: 02^{h} 29^{m} 03.960^{s}
- Declination: +67° 24′ 08.70″
- Apparent magnitude (V): 4.61 (4.65 / 8.48)‍
- ι Cas B
- Right ascension: 02^{h} 29^{m} 03.567^{s}
- Declination: +67° 24′ 07.01″
- Apparent magnitude (V): 6.87
- ι Cas C
- Right ascension: 02^{h} 29^{m} 05.086^{s}
- Declination: +67° 24′ 05.53″
- Apparent magnitude (V): 9.05 (9.14 / 11.84)‍

Characteristics
- U−B color index: +0.03
- B−V color index: +0.12

ι Cas A
- Spectral type: A3p / G6
- Variable type: α^{2} CVn

ι Cas B
- Spectral type: F5

ι Cas C
- Spectral type: K4 / M2
- U−B color index: +0.18
- B−V color index: +0.72

Astrometry
Radial velocity (R_{v})	1.2±2 km/s
Proper motion (μ)	RA: −26.61 mas/yr Dec.: 38.21 mas/yr
Parallax (π)	22.22±0.08 mas
Distance	146.8 ± 0.5 ly (45.0 ± 0.2 pc)
Absolute magnitude (M_{V})	1.62±0.07 (Aa) 5.60±0.17 (Ab)‍

Orbit
Primary	ι Cas Aa
Name	ι Cas Ab
Period (P)	48.72±0.45 yr
Semi-major axis (a)	0.423±0.004″
Eccentricity (e)	0.637±0.004
Inclination (i)	148.2±1.3°
Longitude of the node (Ω)	176.6±1.8°
Periastron epoch (T)	B 1993.21±0.05
Argument of periastron (ω) (secondary)	328.2±1.9°

Orbit
Primary	ι Cas A
Name	ι Cas B
Period (P)	2,400 yr
Semi-major axis (a)	6.50″
Eccentricity (e)	0.40
Inclination (i)	102.9±0.3°
Longitude of the node (Ω)	188.0±0.9°
Periastron epoch (T)	B 940±47
Argument of periastron (ω) (secondary)	113.3±3.4°

Orbit
Primary	ι Cas Ca
Name	ι Cas Cb
Period (P)	70±15 yr
Semi-major axis (a)	0.44±0.04″
Eccentricity (e)	0.42±0.09
Inclination (i)	99.75±0.49°
Longitude of the node (Ω)	93.63±0.82°
Periastron epoch (T)	1945±15 JD
Argument of periastron (ω) (secondary)	290.0±3.8°

Details

ι Cas Aa
Mass	1.98 M_{☉}
Radius	2.3±0.4 R_{☉}
Luminosity	24 L_{☉}
Temperature	8,360±275 K
Rotation	1.74033 d
Rotational velocity (v sin i)	48 km/s
Age	100 Myr

ι Cas Ab
Mass	0.98 M_{☉}

ι Cas B
Mass	1.28 M_{☉}
Radius	1.16 R_{☉}
Luminosity	2.97 L_{☉}
Temperature	6,540 K

ι Cas Ca
Mass	0.96 M_{☉}
Radius	1.04 R_{☉}
Luminosity	0.88 L_{☉}
Temperature	4,520±20 K

ι Cas Cb
Mass	0.70 M_{☉}
Temperature	3,590±45 K

Other designations
- Huagai, BD+66°213, HD 15089, HIP 11569, HR 707, SAO 12298
- ι Cas A: TYC 4058-1504-1
- ι Cas B: TYC 4058-1504-2
- ι Cas C: TYC 4058-1505-1

Database references
SIMBAD	ι Cas
- ι Cas A
- ι Cas B
- ι Cas C

Iota Cassiopeiae, also named Huagai, is a multiple star system in the constellation Cassiopeia. Its name is a Bayer designation that is Latinized from ι Cassiopeiae, and abbreviated Iota Cas or ι Cas. The system has a combined apparent magnitude of about 4.5, making it visible to the naked eye. Based on its parallax, it is located about 133 light-years (41 pc) 133 light-years (41 parsecs) from Earth.

== Nomenclature ==
Iota Cassiopeiae, Latinized from ι Cassiopeiae, is the star's Bayer designation. In Chinese astronomy, this star is part of the asterism Huá Gài (華蓋 "Canopy of the Emperor"), which consists of 16 stars, seven forming Huá Gài proper and nine forming Gàng (槓, "Shaft"). The IAU Working Group on Star Names approved the name Huagai for Iota Cassiopeiae Aa on 25 December 2025, and it is now so entered in the IAU Catalog of Star Names. 50 Cassiopeiae was named Gang.

== Components ==
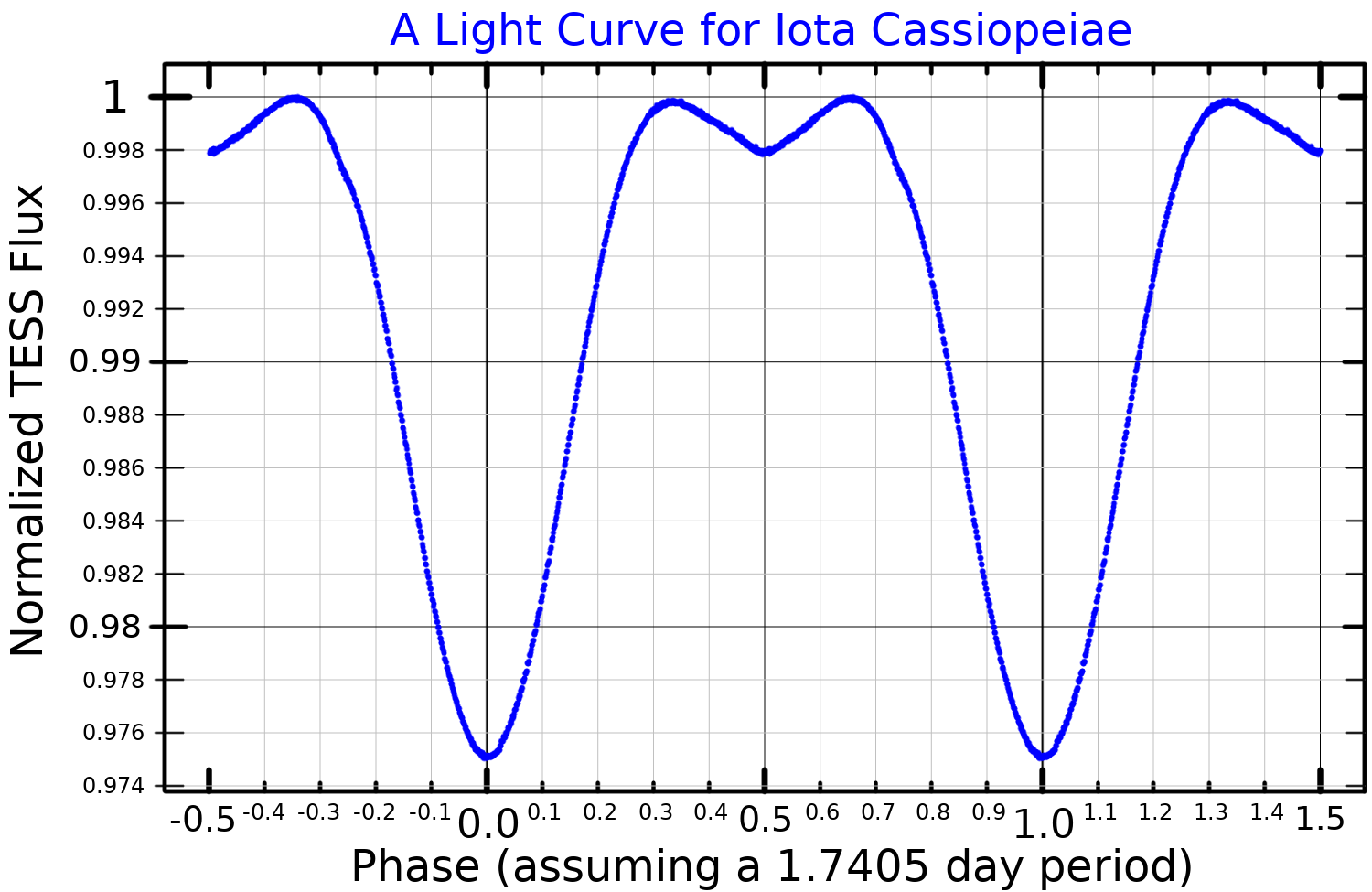
A light curve for Iota Cassiopeiae, plotted from TESS data

Iota Cassiopeiae is known to be a quintuple star system. The brightest star system, ι Cassiopeiae A, contains a white-colored A-type main-sequence star with a mean apparent magnitude of +4.61. The primary is itself a tighter binary star system. The two stars were resolved by adaptive optics. These are designated Aa and Ab (although confusingly they may also be labeled as A and Aa, respectively). The primary is classified as an Alpha^{2} Canum Venaticorum-type variable star and the brightness of the system varies from magnitude +4.45 to +4.53 with a period of 1.74 days, because of its magnetic field. The variability in brightness was first detected by Karl D. Rakos in 1962, although its spectrum was known to be variable from earlier observations. The fainter companion is a G-type star with a mass of 0.98 M_{☉}. The orbital period of the system is about 49 years.

Aa
Period: 1.74 d
Ab
Period: 2,400 y
B
Separation: ≫ 7″
Ca
Separation: 0.20″
Cb

Hierarchy of orbits for Iota Cassiopeiae's components

ι Cassiopeiae B is a yellow-white F-type main sequence dwarf with an apparent magnitude of +6.87. It orbits around ι Cassiopeiae A approximately every 2,400 years with a semi-major axis of around 6.5 arcseconds, but the orbit is not very well constrained. This object may be causing Kozai–Lidov cycles in the inner orbital pair.

ι Cassiopeiae C is itself another binary, designated Ca and Cb, or just C and c. It comprises two stars, a K-type star and an M-type star. It is currently at an angular distance of about 7 arcseconds from the AB pair. Since the semimajor axis of the AB orbit is about 6.5 arcseconds, the true semimajor axis of C's orbit around them is thought to be significantly larger than 7 arcseconds.
