= Omicron Cassiopeiae =

Star in the constellation Cassiopeia

ο Cassiopeiae
- Location of ο Cassiopeiae (circled)

Observation data Epoch J2000.0 Equinox ICRS
- Constellation: Cassiopeia
- Right ascension: 00^{h} 44^{m} 43.519^{s}
- Declination: +48° 17′ 03.73″
- Apparent magnitude (V): 4.30 to 4.62

Characteristics
- Spectral type: B3Ve (Aa); B7V (Ab2)
- U−B color index: −0.53
- B−V color index: −0.06
- Variable type: γ Cas

Astrometry
Radial velocity (R_{v})	−12.36±0.41 km/s
Proper motion (μ)	RA: +17.415 mas/yr Dec.: −8.947 mas/yr
Parallax (π)	4.7046±0.4306 mas
Distance	690 ± 60 ly (210 ± 20 pc)
Absolute magnitude (M_{V})	−2.55 / 0.35

Orbit
Primary	ο Cas Aa
Name	ο Cas Ab
Period (P)	1031.55 d
Semi-major axis (a)	0.0170±0.0006″
Eccentricity (e)	0
Inclination (i)	115.0±2.6°
Longitude of the node (Ω)	267.3±0.8°
Periastron epoch (T)	2452792.2±0.6 JD
Argument of periastron (ω) (secondary)	0°
Semi-amplitude (K_{1}) (primary)	21.593±0.071 km/s

Orbit
Primary	ο Cas Ab1
Name	ο Cas Ab2
Period (P)	11.66043 ± 0.000031
Eccentricity (e)	0 (fixed)
Periastron epoch (T)	60529.5023 ± 0.0078
Semi-amplitude (K_{1}) (primary)	75.79 ± 0.45 km/s
Semi-amplitude (K_{2}) (secondary)	81.47 km/s

Details

ο Cas Aa
Mass	6.07 M_{☉}
Radius	8.0 R_{☉}
Surface gravity (log g)	3.284 cgs
Temperature	14,438 K
Rotational velocity (v sin i)	208±13 km/s

ο Cas Ab1
Mass	3.37 M_{☉}

ο Cas Ab2
Mass	3.26 M_{☉}

Other designations
- ο Cas, 22 Cassiopeiae, BD+47°183, FK5 25, HD 4180, HIP 3504, HR 193, SAO 36620, ADS 622, CCDM J00447+4817

Database references
SIMBAD	ο Cas A
- ο Cas B

Omicron Cassiopeiae is a triple star system in the constellation Cassiopeia. Its name is a Bayer designation that is Latinized from ο Cassiopeiae, and abbreviated Omicron Cas or ο Cas. This star is approximately 690 light-years (210 pc) 700 light-years from Earth, based on its parallax. It is visible to the naked eye with a slightly variable apparent magnitude of about 4.5.

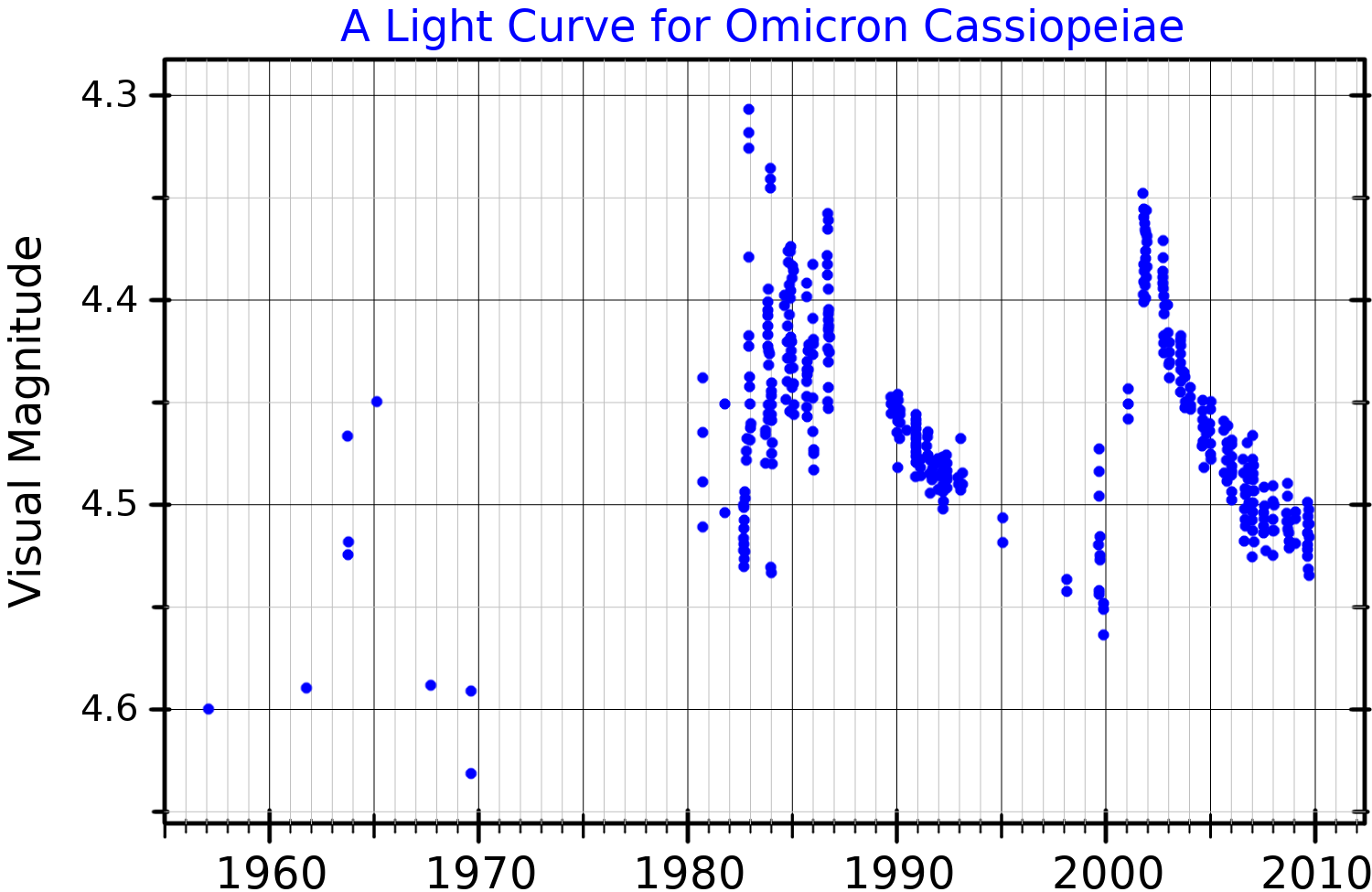
A visual band light curve for Omicron Cassiopeiae, adapted from Koubský et al. (2010)

The primary component, ο Cassiopeiae A, is a spectroscopic binary, and its close companion completes one orbit every 2.83 years (1,031.55 days). The system has also been resolved with interferometry.

The primary of this spectroscopic binary is a blue-white B-type giant star. It is classified as a Gamma Cassiopeiae variable and its brightness varies from magnitude 4.30 to 4.62. It is rotating at a speed of 249 km/s at its equator (close to its theoretical break-up velocity of 332 km/s), although because the pole is inclined 36 degrees, its projected rotational velocity is 208 km/s. The nature of the secondary is not well known. Despite the fact that the secondary is 2.9 magnitudes dimmer than the primary, the secondary appears to have a mass similar to, or even larger than primary. It is possible that the secondary is a pair of early A-type main-sequence stars.

A more distant companion, ο Cassiopeiae B, lies 33.6 arcseconds away. It is an eleventh-magnitude, F-type main-sequence star. Because it has a similar proper motion to the central system, it is assumed to be gravitationally bound.
