= Cassiopeia in Chinese astronomy =

The modern constellation Cassiopeia lies across two of the quadrants symbolized by the Black Tortoise of the North (北方玄武, Běi Fāng Xuán Wǔ), The White Tiger of the West (西方白虎, Xī Fāng Bái Hǔ) and Three Enclosures (三垣, Sān Yuán), that divide the sky in traditional Chinese uranography.

The name of the western constellation in modern Chinese is 仙后座 (xiān hòu zuò), meaning "the immortal queen constellation".

== Stars ==
The map of Chinese constellation in constellation Cassiopeia area consists of :

| Four Symbols | Mansion (Chinese name) | Romanization | Translation | Asterisms (Chinese name) | Romanization | Translation | Western star name | Proper Name | Chinese star name | Romanization | Translation |
|---|---|---|---|---|---|---|---|---|---|---|---|
| Three Enclosures (三垣) | 紫微垣 | Zǐ Wēi Yuán | Purple Forbidden enclosure | 紫微左垣 | Zǐwēizuǒyuán | Left Wall | | | | | |
| Three Enclosures (三垣) | 紫微垣 | Zǐ Wēi Yuán | Purple Forbidden enclosure | 紫微左垣 | Zǐwēizuǒyuán | Left Wall | 23 Cas | | | | |
| Three Enclosures (三垣) | 紫微垣 | Zǐ Wēi Yuán | Purple Forbidden enclosure | 紫微左垣 | Zǐwēizuǒyuán | Left Wall | 23 Cas | | 紫微左垣八 | Zǐwēizuǒyuánbā | 8th star |
| Three Enclosures (三垣) | 紫微垣 | Zǐ Wēi Yuán | Purple Forbidden enclosure | 紫微左垣 | Zǐwēizuǒyuán | Left Wall | 23 Cas | | 少丞 | Shǎochéng | The Second Prime Minister Emirates |
| Three Enclosures (三垣) | 紫微垣 | Zǐ Wēi Yuán | Purple Forbidden enclosure | 紫微左垣 | Zǐwēizuǒyuán | Left Wall | YZ Cas | | 少丞增一 | Shǎochéngzēngyī | 1st additional star of The Second Prime Minister |
| Three Enclosures (三垣) | 紫微垣 | Zǐ Wēi Yuán | Purple Forbidden enclosure | 五帝內座 | Wǔdìnèizuò | Interior Seats of the Five Emperors | | | | | |
| Three Enclosures (三垣) | 紫微垣 | Zǐ Wēi Yuán | Purple Forbidden enclosure | 五帝內座 | Wǔdìnèizuò | Interior Seats of the Five Emperors | 47 Cas | | | | |
| Three Enclosures (三垣) | 紫微垣 | Zǐ Wēi Yuán | Purple Forbidden enclosure | 五帝內座 | Wǔdìnèizuò | Interior Seats of the Five Emperors | 47 Cas | | 五帝內座二 | Wudìnèizuòèr | 2nd star |
| Three Enclosures (三垣) | 紫微垣 | Zǐ Wēi Yuán | Purple Forbidden enclosure | 五帝內座 | Wǔdìnèizuò | Interior Seats of the Five Emperors | 47 Cas | | 东方苍帝 | Dōngfāngcāngdì | Green king in the east |
| Three Enclosures (三垣) | 紫微垣 | Zǐ Wēi Yuán | Purple Forbidden enclosure | 華蓋 | Huāgài | Canopy of the Emperor | 47 Cas | | | | |
| Three Enclosures (三垣) | 紫微垣 | Zǐ Wēi Yuán | Purple Forbidden enclosure | 華蓋 | Huāgài | Canopy of the Emperor | 40 Cas | | 華蓋二 | Huāgàièr | 2nd star |
| Three Enclosures (三垣) | 紫微垣 | Zǐ Wēi Yuán | Purple Forbidden enclosure | 華蓋 | Huāgài | Canopy of the Emperor | V762 Cas | | 華蓋三 | Huāgàisān | 3rd star |
| Three Enclosures (三垣) | 紫微垣 | Zǐ Wēi Yuán | Purple Forbidden enclosure | 華蓋 | Huāgài | Canopy of the Emperor | 31 Cas | | 華蓋四 | Huāgàisì | 4th star |
| Three Enclosures (三垣) | 紫微垣 | Zǐ Wēi Yuán | Purple Forbidden enclosure | 華蓋 | Huāgài | Canopy of the Emperor | ψ Cas | | 華蓋五 | Huāgàiwu | 5th star |
| Three Enclosures (三垣) | 紫微垣 | Zǐ Wēi Yuán | Purple Forbidden enclosure | 華蓋 | Huāgài | Canopy of the Emperor | 43 Cas | | 華蓋六 | Huāgàiliù | 6th star |
| Three Enclosures (三垣) | 紫微垣 | Zǐ Wēi Yuán | Purple Forbidden enclosure | 華蓋 | Huāgài | Canopy of the Emperor | ω Cas | | 華蓋七 | Huāgàiqī | 7th star |
| Three Enclosures (三垣) | 紫微垣 | Zǐ Wēi Yuán | Purple Forbidden enclosure | 杠 | Gāng | Canopy Support | | | | | |
| Three Enclosures (三垣) | 紫微垣 | Zǐ Wēi Yuán | Purple Forbidden enclosure | 杠 | Gāng | Canopy Support | HD 19275 | | 杠二 | Gāngèr | 2nd star |
| Three Enclosures (三垣) | 紫微垣 | Zǐ Wēi Yuán | Purple Forbidden enclosure | 杠 | Gāng | Canopy Support | 49 Cas | Rangifer | 杠三 | Gāngsān | 3rd star |
| Three Enclosures (三垣) | 紫微垣 | Zǐ Wēi Yuán | Purple Forbidden enclosure | 杠 | Gāng | Canopy Support | 51 Cas | | 杠四 | Gāngsì | 4th star |
| Three Enclosures (三垣) | 紫微垣 | Zǐ Wēi Yuán | Purple Forbidden enclosure | 杠 | Gāng | Canopy Support | 50 Cas | Gang | 杠五 | Gāngwu | 5th star |
| Three Enclosures (三垣) | 紫微垣 | Zǐ Wēi Yuán | Purple Forbidden enclosure | 杠 | Gāng | Canopy Support | 54 Cas | | 杠六 | Gāngliù | 6th star |
| Three Enclosures (三垣) | 紫微垣 | Zǐ Wēi Yuán | Purple Forbidden enclosure | 杠 | Gāng | Canopy Support | 48 Cas | | 杠七 | Gāngqī | 7th star |
| Three Enclosures (三垣) | 紫微垣 | Zǐ Wēi Yuán | Purple Forbidden enclosure | 杠 | Gāng | Canopy Support | 42 Cas | | 杠八 | Gāngbā | 8th star |
| Three Enclosures (三垣) | 紫微垣 | Zǐ Wēi Yuán | Purple Forbidden enclosure | 杠 | Gāng | Canopy Support | 38 Cas | | 杠九 | Gāngjiǔ | 9th star |
| Three Enclosures (三垣) | 紫微垣 | Zǐ Wēi Yuán | Purple Forbidden enclosure | 杠 | Gāng | Canopy Support | HD 15920 | | 杠增一 | Gāngzēngyī | 1st additional star |
| Three Enclosures (三垣) | 紫微垣 | Zǐ Wēi Yuán | Purple Forbidden enclosure | 傳舍 | Chuánshě | Guest House | | | | | |
| Three Enclosures (三垣) | 紫微垣 | Zǐ Wēi Yuán | Purple Forbidden enclosure | 傳舍 | Chuánshě | Guest House | 16 Cas | | 傳舍二 | Chuánshěèr | 2nd star |
| Three Enclosures (三垣) | 紫微垣 | Zǐ Wēi Yuán | Purple Forbidden enclosure | 傳舍 | Chuánshě | Guest House | 32 Cas | | 傳舍四 | Chuánshěsì | 4th star |
| Three Enclosures (三垣) | 紫微垣 | Zǐ Wēi Yuán | Purple Forbidden enclosure | 傳舍 | Chuánshě | Guest House | 55 Cas | | 傳舍五 | Chuánshěwu | 5th star |
| Three Enclosures (三垣) | 紫微垣 | Zǐ Wēi Yuán | Purple Forbidden enclosure | 傳舍 | Chuánshě | Guest House | HD 17948 | | 傳舍六 | Chuánshěliù | 6th star |
| Three Enclosures (三垣) | 紫微垣 | Zǐ Wēi Yuán | Purple Forbidden enclosure | 傳舍 | Chuánshě | Guest House | 13 Cas | | 傳舍增一 | Chuánshězēngyī | 1st additional star |
| The Black Tortoise of the North (北方玄武) | 室 | Shì | Encampment | 騰蛇 | Téngshé | Flying Serpent | | | | | |
| The Black Tortoise of the North (北方玄武) | 室 | Shì | Encampment | 騰蛇 | Téngshé | Flying Serpent | σ Cas | | 螣蛇十一 | Téngshéshíyī | 11th star |
| The Black Tortoise of the North (北方玄武) | 室 | Shì | Encampment | 騰蛇 | Téngshé | Flying Serpent | ρ Cas | | 螣蛇十二 | Téngshéshíèr | 12th star |
| The Black Tortoise of the North (北方玄武) | 室 | Shì | Encampment | 騰蛇 | Téngshé | Flying Serpent | τ Cas | | 螣蛇十三 | Téngshéshísān | 13th star |
| The Black Tortoise of the North (北方玄武) | 室 | Shì | Encampment | 騰蛇 | Téngshé | Flying Serpent | AR Cas | | 螣蛇十四 | Téngshéshísì | 14th star |
| The Black Tortoise of the North (北方玄武) | 室 | Shì | Encampment | 騰蛇 | Téngshé | Flying Serpent | 1 Cas | | 螣蛇增十三 | Téngshézēngshísān | 13th additional star |
| The Black Tortoise of the North (北方玄武) | 室 | Shì | Encampment | 騰蛇 | Téngshé | Flying Serpent | 4 Cas | | 螣蛇增十四 | Téngshézēngshísì | 14th additional star |
| The Black Tortoise of the North (北方玄武) | 室 | Shì | Encampment | 騰蛇 | Téngshé | Flying Serpent | 2 Cas | | 螣蛇增十五 | Téngshézēngshíwǔ | 15th additional star |
| The Black Tortoise of the North (北方玄武) | 室 | Shì | Encampment | 騰蛇 | Téngshé | Flying Serpent | V1022 Cas | | 螣蛇增十八 | Téngshézēngshíbā | 18th additional star |
| The White Tiger of the West (西方白虎) | 奎 | Kuí | Legs | 閣道 | Gédào | Flying Corridor | | | | | |
| The White Tiger of the West (西方白虎) | 奎 | Kuí | Legs | 閣道 | Gédào | Flying Corridor | ι Cas | Huagai | 閣道一 | Gédàoyī | 1st star |
| The White Tiger of the West (西方白虎) | 奎 | Kuí | Legs | 閣道 | Gédào | Flying Corridor | ε Cas | Segin | 閣道二 | Gédàoèr | 2nd star |
| The White Tiger of the West (西方白虎) | 奎 | Kuí | Legs | 閣道 | Gédào | Flying Corridor | δ Cas | Ruchbah (for component Aa) | | | |
| The White Tiger of the West (西方白虎) | 奎 | Kuí | Legs | 閣道 | Gédào | Flying Corridor | δ Cas | Ruchbah (for component Aa) | 閣道三 | Gédàosān | 3rd star |
| The White Tiger of the West (西方白虎) | 奎 | Kuí | Legs | 閣道 | Gédào | Flying Corridor | δ Cas | Ruchbah (for component Aa) | 奎西南大星 | Gédàonándàxīng | Big southern star |
| The White Tiger of the West (西方白虎) | 奎 | Kuí | Legs | 閣道 | Gédào | Flying Corridor | θ Cas | | 閣道四 | Gédàosì | 4th star |
| The White Tiger of the West (西方白虎) | 奎 | Kuí | Legs | 閣道 | Gédào | Flying Corridor | ν Cas | | 閣道五 | Gédàowu | 5th star |
| The White Tiger of the West (西方白虎) | 奎 | Kuí | Legs | 閣道 | Gédào | Flying Corridor | ο Cas | | 閣道六 | Gédàoliù | 6th star |
| The White Tiger of the West (西方白虎) | 奎 | Kuí | Legs | 閣道 | Gédào | Flying Corridor | π Cas | | 閣道增一 | Gédàozēngyī | 1st additional star |
| The White Tiger of the West (西方白虎) | 奎 | Kuí | Legs | 閣道 | Gédào | Flying Corridor | ξ Cas | | 閣道增二 | Gédàozēngèr | 2nd additional star |
| The White Tiger of the West (西方白虎) | 奎 | Kuí | Legs | 閣道 | Gédào | Flying Corridor | φ Cas | | 閣道增三 | Gédàozēngsān | 3rd additional star |
| The White Tiger of the West (西方白虎) | 奎 | Kuí | Legs | 閣道 | Gédào | Flying Corridor | χ Cas | | 閣道增四 | Gédàozēngsì | 4th additional star |
| The White Tiger of the West (西方白虎) | 奎 | Kuí | Legs | 閣道 | Gédào | Flying Corridor | 44 Cas | | 閣道增五 | Gédàozēngwǔ | 5th additional star |
| The White Tiger of the West (西方白虎) | 奎 | Kuí | Legs | 附路 | Fùlù | Auxiliary Road | ζ Cas | Fulu | 附路 | Fùlù | (One star of) |
| The White Tiger of the West (西方白虎) | 奎 | Kuí | Legs | 王良 | Wángliáng | Wang Liang | | | | | |
| The White Tiger of the West (西方白虎) | 奎 | Kuí | Legs | 王良 | Wángliáng | Wang Liang | β Cas | Caph | | | |
| The White Tiger of the West (西方白虎) | 奎 | Kuí | Legs | 王良 | Wángliáng | Wang Liang | β Cas | Caph | 王良一 | Wángliángyī | 1st star |
| The White Tiger of the West (西方白虎) | 奎 | Kuí | Legs | 王良 | Wángliáng | Wang Liang | β Cas | Caph | 王良距星 | Wángliángjùxīng | Separated star |
| The White Tiger of the West (西方白虎) | 奎 | Kuí | Legs | 王良 | Wángliáng | Wang Liang | β Cas | Caph | 王良西星 | Wángliángxīxīng | Western star |
| The White Tiger of the West (西方白虎) | 奎 | Kuí | Legs | 王良 | Wángliáng | Wang Liang | κ Cas | Cexing | | | |
| The White Tiger of the West (西方白虎) | 奎 | Kuí | Legs | 王良 | Wángliáng | Wang Liang | κ Cas | Cexing | 王良二 | Wángliángèr | 2nd star |
| The White Tiger of the West (西方白虎) | 奎 | Kuí | Legs | 王良 | Wángliáng | Wang Liang | κ Cas | Cexing | 王良西星 | Wángliángxīxīng | Western star |
| The White Tiger of the West (西方白虎) | 奎 | Kuí | Legs | 王良 | Wángliáng | Wang Liang | η Cas | Achird (for component A) | 王良三 | Wángliángsān | 3rd star |
| The White Tiger of the West (西方白虎) | 奎 | Kuí | Legs | 王良 | Wángliáng | Wang Liang | α Cas | Schedar | | | |
| The White Tiger of the West (西方白虎) | 奎 | Kuí | Legs | 王良 | Wángliáng | Wang Liang | α Cas | Schedar | 王良四 | Wángliángsì | 4th star |
| The White Tiger of the West (西方白虎) | 奎 | Kuí | Legs | 王良 | Wángliáng | Wang Liang | α Cas | Schedar | 王良 | Wángliáng | Wise king |
| The White Tiger of the West (西方白虎) | 奎 | Kuí | Legs | 王良 | Wángliáng | Wang Liang | λ Cas | | 王良五 | Wángliángwu | 5th star |
| The White Tiger of the West (西方白虎) | 奎 | Kuí | Legs | 王良 | Wángliáng | Wang Liang | 6 Cas | | 王良增一 | Wángliángzēngyī | 1st additional star |
| The White Tiger of the West (西方白虎) | 奎 | Kuí | Legs | 王良 | Wángliáng | Wang Liang | 10 Cas | | 王良增二 | Wángliángzēngèr | 2nd additional star |
| The White Tiger of the West (西方白虎) | 奎 | Kuí | Legs | 王良 | Wángliáng | Wang Liang | 9 Cas | | 王良增三 | Wángliángzēngsān | 3rd additional star |
| The White Tiger of the West (西方白虎) | 奎 | Kuí | Legs | 王良 | Wángliáng | Wang Liang | 12 Cas | | 王良增四 | Wángliángzēngsì | 4th additional star |
| The White Tiger of the West (西方白虎) | 奎 | Kuí | Legs | 王良 | Wángliáng | Wang Liang | υ^{2} Cas | Castula | 王良增五 | Wángliángzēngwǔ | 5th additional star |
| The White Tiger of the West (西方白虎) | 奎 | Kuí | Legs | 王良 | Wángliáng | Wang Liang | HD 222275 | | 王良增六 | Wángliángzēngliù | 6th additional star |
| The White Tiger of the West (西方白虎) | 奎 | Kuí | Legs | 王良 | Wángliáng | Wang Liang | HD 222682 | | 王良增七 | Wángliángzēngqī | 7th additional star |
| The White Tiger of the West (西方白虎) | 奎 | Kuí | Legs | 王良 | Wángliáng | Wang Liang | HD 223421 | | 王良增八 | Wángliángzēngbā | 8th additional star |
| The White Tiger of the West (西方白虎) | 奎 | Kuí | Legs | 王良 | Wángliáng | Wang Liang | HD 224784 | | 王良增九 | Wángliángzēngjiǔ | 9th additional star |
| The White Tiger of the West (西方白虎) | 奎 | Kuí | Legs | 王良 | Wángliáng | Wang Liang | HD 224893 | | 王良增十 | Wángliángzēngshí | 10th additional star |
| The White Tiger of the West (西方白虎) | 奎 | Kuí | Legs | 王良 | Wángliáng | Wang Liang | HD 1239 | | 王良增十一 | Wángliángzēngshíyī | 11th additional star |
| The White Tiger of the West (西方白虎) | 奎 | Kuí | Legs | 王良 | Wángliáng | Wang Liang | HD 2054 | | 王良增十二 | Wángliángzēngshíèr | 12th additional star |
| The White Tiger of the West (西方白虎) | 奎 | Kuí | Legs | 王良 | Wángliáng | Wang Liang | HD 3240 | | 王良增十三 | Wángliángzēngshísān | 13th additional star |
| The White Tiger of the West (西方白虎) | 奎 | Kuí | Legs | 王良 | Wángliáng | Wang Liang | HD 5015 | | 王良增十四 | Wángliángzēngshísì | 14th additional star |
| The White Tiger of the West (西方白虎) | 奎 | Kuí | Legs | 策 | Cè | Whip | | | | | |
| The White Tiger of the West (西方白虎) | 奎 | Kuí | Legs | 策 | Cè | Whip | γ Cas | Tianshi | | | |
| The White Tiger of the West (西方白虎) | 奎 | Kuí | Legs | 策 | Cè | Whip | γ Cas | Tianshi | 策 | Cè | (One star of) |
| The White Tiger of the West (西方白虎) | 奎 | Kuí | Legs | 策 | Cè | Whip | γ Cas | Tianshi | 天策 | Tiāncè | Celestial whip |
| The White Tiger of the West (西方白虎) | 奎 | Kuí | Legs | 策 | Cè | Whip | γ Cas | Tianshi | 八魁南大星 | Bākuínándàxīng | Big star in the south of Net for Catching Bird constellation |

== See also ==
- Traditional Chinese star names
- Chinese constellations
- List of constellations by area
