= Custos =

Custos is the Latin word for guard.

== Titles ==
- Custos rotulorum ("keeper of the rolls"), a civic post in parts of the United Kingdom and in Jamaica
- Custos (Franciscans), a religious superior or official in the Franciscan Order
- Custos (under-sacristan), a Roman Catholic office

== Music ==
- Custos, the Latin word for a Direct (music symbol)

== Other ==
- AB Custos, a Swedish investment company
- Custos, a fictional secret organization in the Japanese film series Towa no Quon
- Custos Messium, an obsolete constellation
- A modern name for the star BE Camelopardalis

== Proverbs ==
- The nominative and accusative plural form custodes is used in the proverbial phrase Quis custodiet ipsos custodes?, "Who has custody of the custodians?".
