= Rangifer =

Rangifer may refer to:

- Rangifer (genus), generic name of the scientific name of reindeer
- Rangifer (journal); a scientific journal about reindeer husbandry research
- Rangifer (constellation); the Reindeer, an obsolete constellation
- A modern name for the star 49 Cassiopeiae

== See also ==
- Reindeer (disambiguation)
