= Tarandus =

Tarandus can refer to:

- tarandus, the specific name of the scientific name of reindeer
- Tarandus a legendary animal, mentioned in Greek, Roman and medieval scripts.
- Tarandus (constellation), also known as Rangifer (both names meaning the Reindeer in Latin), an obsolete constellation
- Dodia tarandus, a species of moth
- Mesotopus tarandus (Swederus, 1787), a species of beetle
- A modern name for the star 2 Ursae Minoris

== See also ==
- Reindeer (disambiguation)
