= YZ =

YZ, Y.Z., or Yz may refer to:

== Arts and Entertainment ==
- Yz (comics), a DC Comics character
- YZ (film), a 2016 Marathi-language film
- YZ (rapper), an American musician
- YZ Group, ancient Greek Attic vase painters
- Yokomo YZ-834B, a remote-controlled toy car

== Astronomy ==
- YZ Canis Minoris, a red dwarf star
- YZ Cassiopeiae, a naked-eye-visible triple star system
- YZ Ceti, a nearby red dwarf in Cetus

== Transport ==
- China Rail hard seat class YZ
- Yamaha YZ motorcycles, see List of Yamaha motorcycles
- Yuanzheng spacecraft upper stage

== See also ==
- ZY (disambiguation)
