= ZZY =

ZZY or zzy may refer to:

- Zhao Ziyang (1919 – 2005), Chinese politician
- The romanization of the Yi Syllable "ꋩ"
- ZZY Productions, a U.S. TV production company, who produced the 1990 TV miniseries Drug Wars: The Camarena Story

== See also ==
- ZYY
- 2ZY
- ZY (disambiguation)
