= 4 Cassiopeiae =

Star in the constellation Cassiopeia

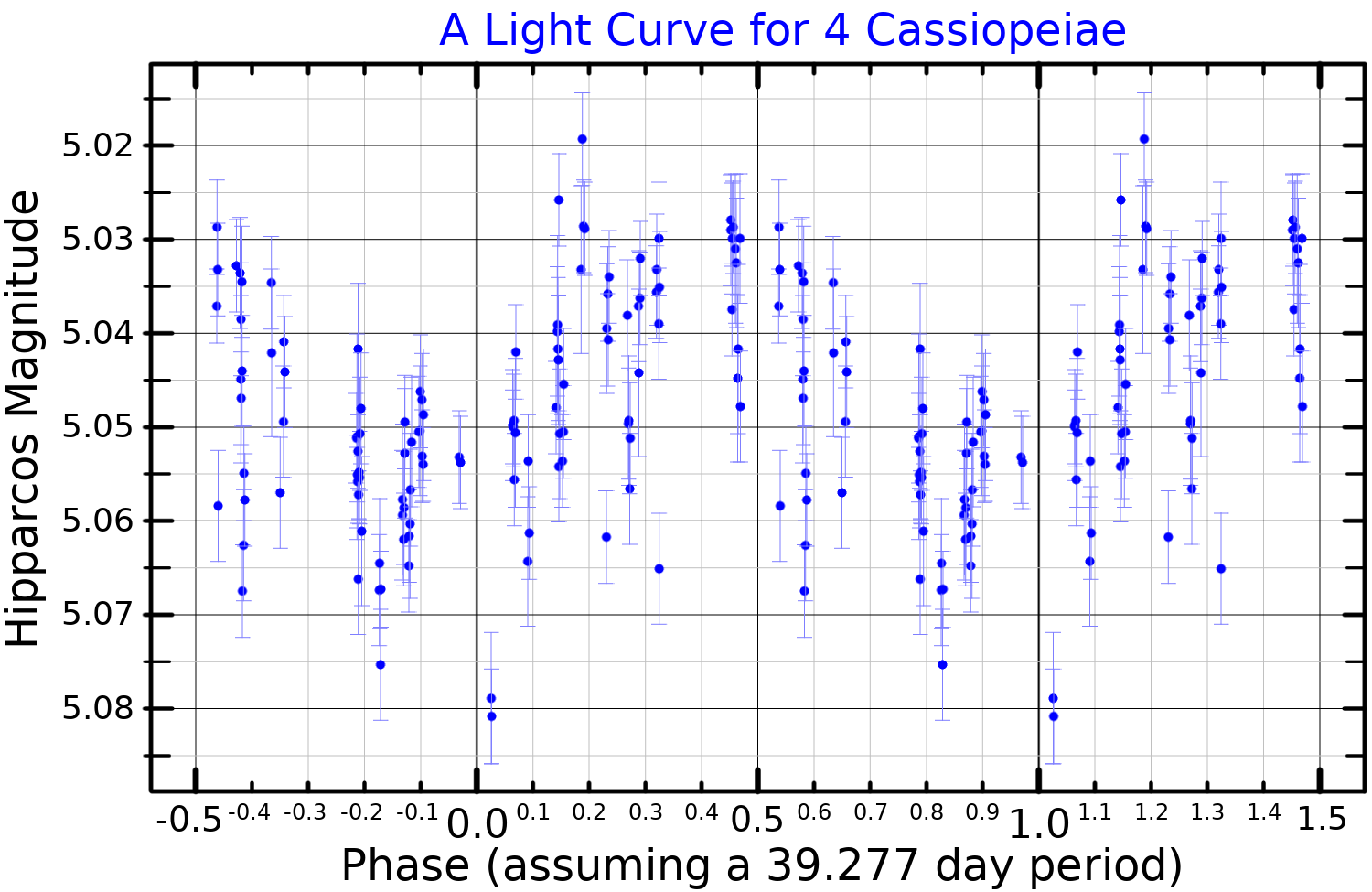
- A light curve for 4 Cassiopeiae, plotted from Hipparcos data. The assumed period is from Koen and Eyer (2002).

Observation data Epoch J2000.0 Equinox ICRS
- Constellation: Cassiopeia
- Right ascension: 23^{h} 24^{m} 50.26237^{s}
- Declination: +62° 16′ 58.1094″
- Apparent magnitude (V): 4.96 (4.95 – 5.00)

Characteristics
- Evolutionary stage: AGB
- Spectral type: M2− IIIab
- B−V color index: 1.676±0.010
- Variable type: suspected

Astrometry
Radial velocity (R_{v})	−38.99±0.23 km/s
Proper motion (μ)	RA: +12.29 mas/yr Dec.: −12.44 mas/yr
Parallax (π)	4.15±0.21 mas
Distance	790 ± 40 ly (240 ± 10 pc)
Absolute magnitude (M_{V})	−1.94

Details
Mass	2.3 M_{☉}
Radius	78 R_{☉}
Luminosity	1,419 L_{☉}
Temperature	4,000 K

Other designations
- 4 Cas, NSV 14549, BD+61°2444, FK5 882, HD 220652, HIP 115590, HR 8904, SAO 20614, WDS J23248+6217A

Database references
SIMBAD	data

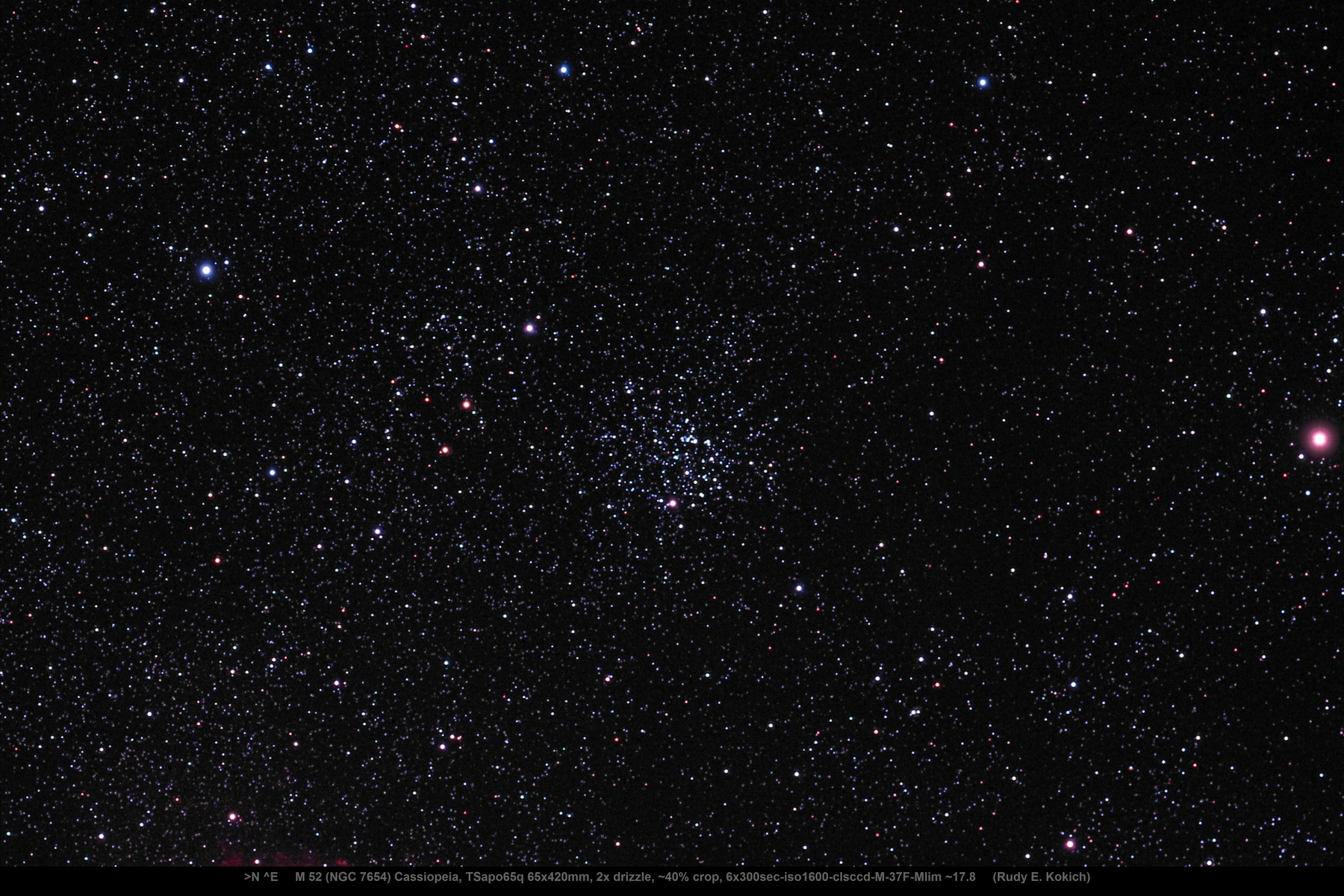
Messier 52, with the bright star 4 Cassiopeiae on the right (north) edge of the image

4 Cassiopeiae is a red giant in the northern constellation of Cassiopeia, located approximately 790 light-years away from the Sun. It is visible to the naked eye as a faint, red-hued star with a baseline apparent visual magnitude of 4.96. At the distance of this system, its visual magnitude is diminished by an extinction of 0.56 due to interstellar dust. This system is moving closer to the Earth with a heliocentric radial velocity of −39 km/s.

An evolved red giant star, currently on the asymptotic giant branch, 4 Cassiopeiae has a stellar classification of M2− IIIab. It is a suspected variable star of unknown type with a brightness that varies from visual magnitude 4.95 down to 5.00.

Multiple star catalogues list a number of companions to 4 Cassiopeiae, all unrelated stars at different distances. As of 2011, the magnitude 9.88 component B lay at an angular separation of 96.10″ along a position angle of 226° relative to the primary. Components C, E, F, and G are all fainter and more than two arc-minutes from 4 Cassiopeiae, and components C and G are themselves close doubles.

4 Cassiopeiae is 40' north of the open cluster Messier 52, near the constellation border with Cepheus, although it is not a member of the cluster.
