= Custos Messium =

Former constellation

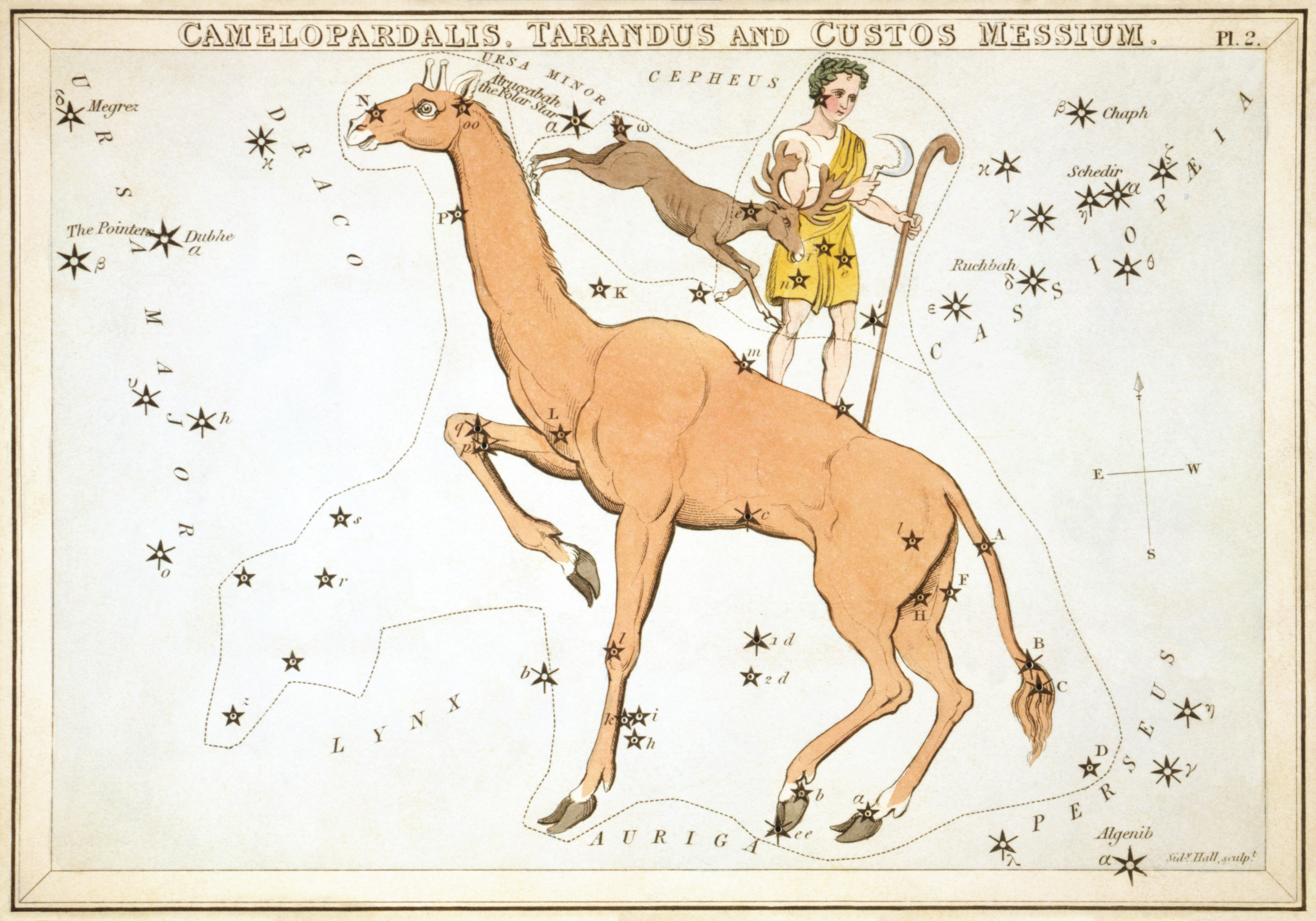
Custos Messium and the likewise-obsolete constellation of Tarandus depicted above Camelopardalis.

Custos Messium (Latin for harvest-keeper) — also known as “Vineyard Keeper," “Le Messier,” "Mietitore," and "Erndtehüter" — was a constellation created by Joseph Jérôme Lefrançois de Lalande to honor Charles Messier. It was introduced in 1775, and was located between the constellations Camelopardalis, Cassiopeia, Cepheus, and next to another subsequently abandoned constellation, Rangifer the Reindeer. Custos Messium is no longer recognized.

== Etymology ==
Custos is derived from the classical Latin "custōs” meaning “Guardian” or “Keeper”. Messium is derived from the classical Latin “messis” meaning "harvest.”

== History ==
After the discovery of comet C/1774 P1, (also known as Comet Montaigne]), Messier extensively observed and recorded information about the comet. Lalande noticed that the path the comet followed passed through several unformed stars that were associated with Camelopardalis. To unify the stars, as well as honor Charles Messier for his dedication to astronomy and comet discovery, Lalande introduced Le Messier, or Custos Messium. The stars in Custos Messium are anonymous and nearly invisible to the naked eye.

Several factors went into Lalande’s decision of introducing a harvest keeper. Evidence suggests that Lalande was trying to avoid putting a living figure among the stars, but by deriving the Latin word for harvest, messium, from Messier’s surname, Lalande was able to find a clever way to allude to Messier. The location of the constellation is also believed to be carefully considered. The surrounding constellations, Cassiopeia, Cepheus, and Camelopardalis, all have roots that connect them to agriculture. Similarly, the Phoenicians viewed the part of the sky Custos Messium was located in as a giant wheat field. The location could also suggest that Custos Messium was meant to serve as the northern hemisphere counterpart to the southern hemisphere constellation Polophylax, or the Guardian of the Pole. This idea was due to both constellations being circumpolar, as well as the idea of being representational guardians.

Custos Messium was popularized by its early adaptation in Johann Elert Bode’s Vorstellung der Gestirne. The constellation was also included in a number of astronomy literatures at the time, such as the German addition of John Flamsteed’s Atlas Coelestis, Bode’s Uranographia, and Bode’s Allgemeine Beschreibung und Nachweisung der Gestirne. Custos Messium remained in circulation for around a century, slowly fading out of astronomy texts by the mid-nineteenth century, and completely falling out of recognition by the end of the nineteenth century. The border of the constellation Cassiopia was carefully drawn to incorporate the majority of the stars belonging to Custos Messium.

== Stars ==
The brightest star in the constellation was 50 Cassiopeiae. Other stars include 23 Cassiopeiae, 47 Cassiopeiae, 49 Cassiopeiae, and γ Camelopardalis. Bode also gave them Bayer designations from A to r, while omitting i and k and adding an F as well. The stars were returned to their original constellations when the International Astronomical Union did not include Custos Messium on the list of the 88 official constellations in 1922.

In 2025, the IAU Working Group on Star Names adopted the name Custos for the star BE Camelopardalis, after the obsolete constellation. The constellation's brightest star, 50 Cassiopeiae, was named Gang after a Chinese constellation.

== See also ==
- Former constellations
