= HD 3240 =

Star in the constellation Cassiopeia

Observation data Epoch J2000.0 Equinox ICRS
- Constellation: Cassiopeia
- Right ascension: 00^{h} 36^{m} 08.31020^{s}
- Declination: +54° 10′ 06.4197″
- Apparent magnitude (V): 5.08

Characteristics
- Evolutionary stage: main sequence
- Spectral type: B8IV
- B−V color index: −0.098±0.003
- Variable type: constant

Astrometry
Radial velocity (R_{v})	+1.1±2.8 km/s
Proper motion (μ)	RA: +22.954 mas/yr Dec.: −1.905 mas/yr
Parallax (π)	6.6398±0.0816 mas
Distance	491 ± 6 ly (151 ± 2 pc)
Absolute magnitude (M_{V})	−1.03

Details
Mass	3.91±0.08 M_{☉}
Radius	3.9 R_{☉}
Luminosity	405+43 −39 L_{☉}
Surface gravity (log g)	3.696±0.016 cgs
Temperature	11,885±82 K
Metallicity [Fe/H]	−0.59 dex
Rotational velocity (v sin i)	59 km/s
Age	201 Myr

Other designations
- BD+53°102, GC 708, HD 3240, HIP 2854, HR 144, SAO 21551, GSC 03654-02131

Database references
SIMBAD	data

HD 3240 is a single star in the northern constellation of Cassiopeia, positioned near Zeta Cassiopeiae. This object has a blue-white hue and is dimly visible to the naked eye with an apparent visual magnitude of 5.08. The distance to HD 3240 is approximately 480 light years based on parallax. At that range, the visual magnitude of the star is diminished by an extinction of 0.22 due to interstellar dust.

This star has a stellar classification of B9IV, matching a subgiant that has exhausted the supply of hydrogen at its core. Despite the spectral luminosity class, evolutionary models place the star near the end of the main sequence, having gone through 91% of its main sequence lifespan. It is around 201 million years old and is spinning with a projected rotational velocity of 59 km/s, well below its critical velocity of 335 km/s. The star has 3.9 times the mass of the Sun and is radiating 405 times the Sun's luminosity from its photosphere at an effective temperature of 11,885 K.
