= ZY =

ZY, Z.Y., or Zy may refer to:

== Arts and media ==
- 2ZY, a 1920s British radio station
- ZY, a fictional assistant of the superhero Masked Marvel (Centaur Publications)

== Businesses ==
- Zy.com, ZyWeb's former owner
- ZY, a women's clothing chain by WE
- Sky Airlines, Turkey (2000–2013; IATA code: ZY)

== Technology ==
- ZY, a model of Mazda Z engine
- ZY 1, a satellite launched by the China–Brazil Earth Resources Satellite program

== See also ==
- Ozy Media, whose logo is a "ZY" circumscribed by an "O"
- YZ (disambiguation)
