= 50 Cassiopeiae =

Star in the constellation Cassiopeia

- Location of 50 Cassiopeiae (circled in red)

Observation data Epoch J2000 Equinox ICRS
- Constellation: Cassiopeia
- Right ascension: 02^{h} 03^{m} 26.10206^{s}
- Declination: +72° 25′ 16.6376″
- Apparent magnitude (V): +3.95

Characteristics
- Evolutionary stage: main sequence
- Spectral type: A2 V
- B−V color index: −0.002±0.007

Astrometry
Radial velocity (R_{v})	−18.2±0.9 km/s
Proper motion (μ)	RA: −43.57 mas/yr Dec.: +22.30 mas/yr
Parallax (π)	20.76±0.14 mas
Distance	157 ± 1 ly (48.2 ± 0.3 pc)
Absolute magnitude (M_{V})	0.54

Details
Mass	2.56±0.03 M_{☉}
Radius	2.5 R_{☉}
Luminosity	63.8+3.5 −6.4 L_{☉}
Temperature	9,376+240 −235 K
Metallicity [Fe/H]	+0.18±0.28 dex
Rotational velocity (v sin i)	91 km/s

Other designations
- Gang, 50 Cas, BD+71°117, FK5 70, GC 2445, HD 12216, HIP 9598, HR 580, SAO 4560, NGC 771

Database references
SIMBAD	data

50 Cassiopeiae, also named Gang, is a white star in the northern constellation of Cassiopeia. In the past, it had been misidentified as a suspected nebula, and given the number NGC 771. The star is visible to the naked eye, having an apparent visual magnitude of +3.95. Based upon an annual parallax shift of 20.76 mas, it is located 157 light years away. It is moving closer, having a heliocentric radial velocity of −18 km/s, and will approach to within 82 ly in 1.879 million years.

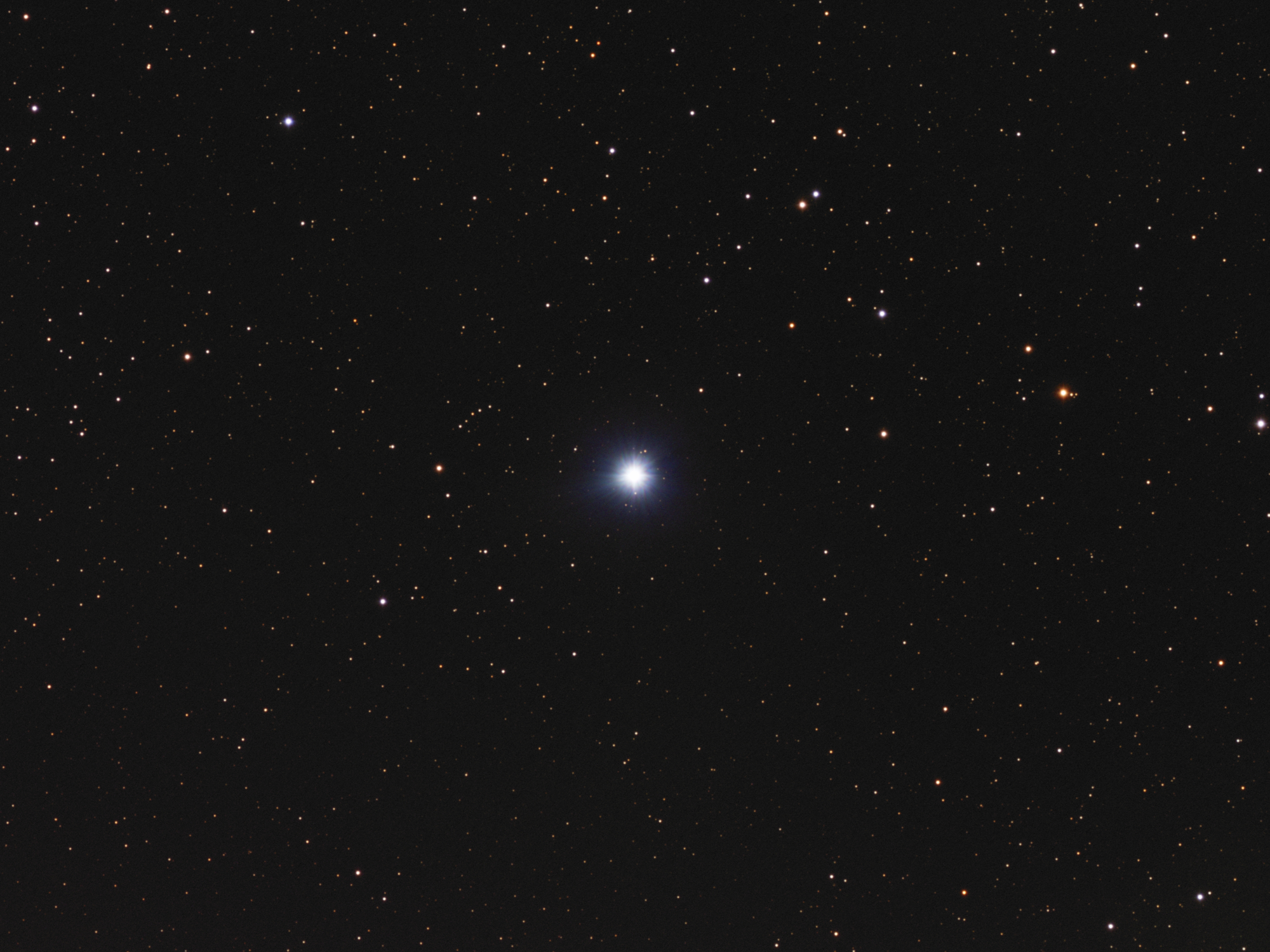
50 Cassiopeiae in optical light

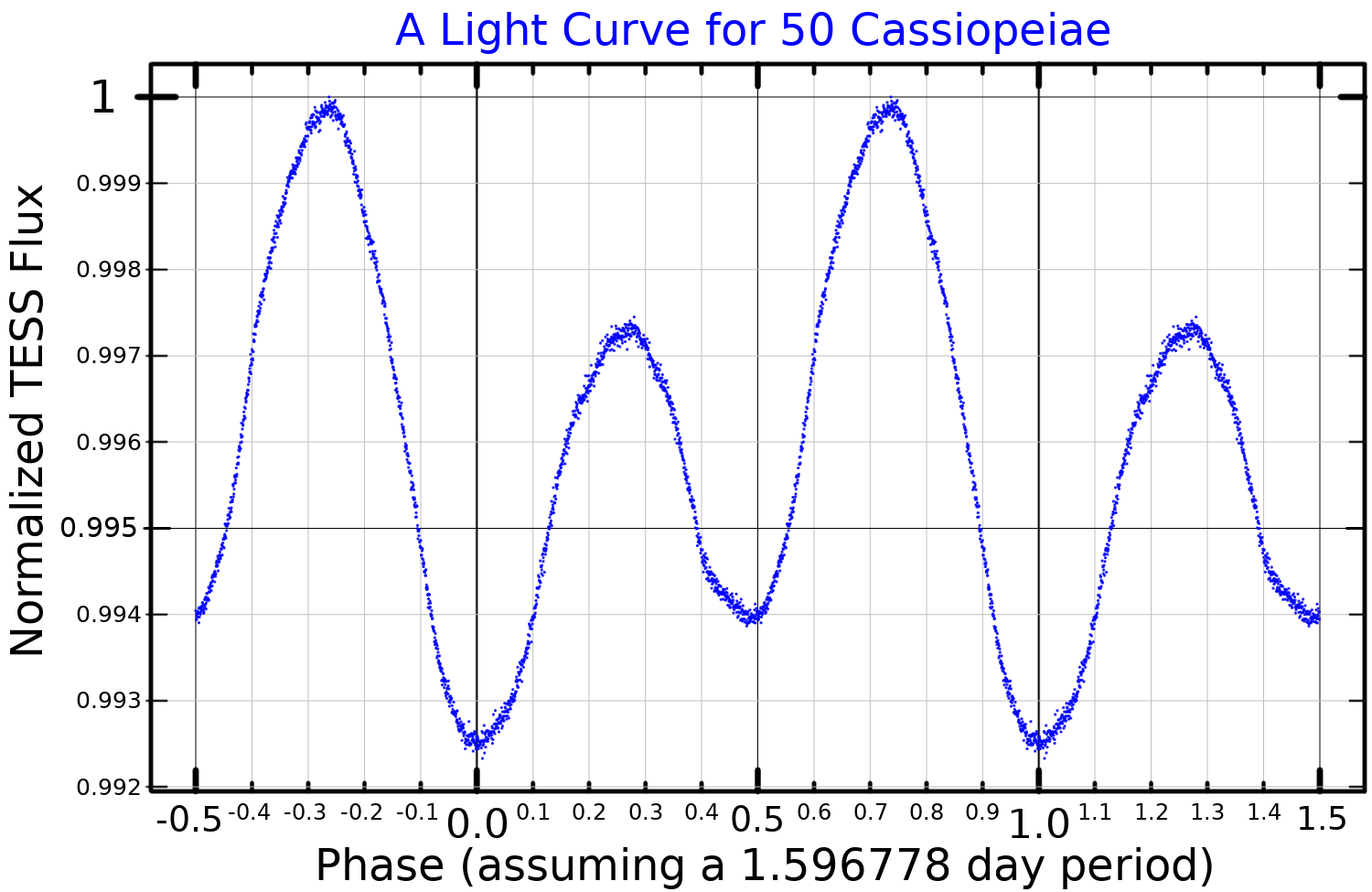
A light curve for 50 Cassiopeiae, plotted from TESS data

It is an A-type main-sequence star with a stellar classification of A2 V. It is a suspected variable star with a very small amplitude. 50 Cas has an estimated 2.56 times the mass of the Sun, and about 2.5 times the Sun's radius. It is radiating 64 times the Sun's luminosity from its photosphere at an effective temperature of around 9,376 K.

The star was the brightest star in the occasionally used 1775 to 19th century constellation Custos Messium, typically drawn as a depiction of Charles Messier standing on top of the giraffe (Camelopardalis), between Cepheus and Cassiopeia.

In Chinese astronomy, this star is part of the asterism Gàng (槓, "Shaft"), itself part of Huá Gài (華蓋 "Canopy of the Emperor"). The IAU Working Group on Star Names approved the name Gang for 50 Cassiopeiae on 25 December 2025, and it is now so entered in the IAU Catalog of Star Names. The name Huagai was adopted for ι Cassiopeiae Aa, and Custos (after Custos Messium) for BE Camelopardalis.
