= ZyWeb =

Online webpage authoring tool

- Developer: ZyNet Ltd
- Stable release: 3.1
- Type: WYSIWYG web editor
- Website: www.zyweb.com

ZyWeb is an online webpage authoring tool, created and owned by ZyNet Ltd, and is currently at version 3.1. It was an early adopter of an entirely server-based solution. ZyWeb was created to enable non-technical users to create and publish websites without the need for any design, authoring or technical skills.

== History ==
ZyWeb has been in service since 1998. The initial development was by two British companies with a common background in the world of Acorn Computers, part of the ancient history of personal computing. Xara Ltd (www.xara.com), which had grown out of Computer Concepts, brought their experience with vector graphics to provide what remains one of ZyWeb's USPs, its "smart graphics". ZyNet Ltd (www.zynet.net), which had grown out of Minerva Software, brought their experience as one of the earliest ISPs in the UK.

Once the product was launched, the two companies joined to form a new company, known as Zy.com, and this company followed the all-too-familiar progress of so many others during the dot com bubble of the 1990s. A something-for-nothing business model drove explosive growth in the user base, with numbers in the millions at its peak. Venture capital was attracted and millions of dollars were burned before the bubble burst and Zy.com collapsed. However, unlike so many other services, ZyWeb survived this period intact. One of the original founders, ZyNet Ltd, purchased the assets from the liquidated company and continued to develop and improve the service with a more viable business model.

== Information ==
ZyWeb is founded on a Windows platform, using ASP/VBScript to wrap up custom COM objects, largely written in C++. When development started in 1998, the available platform was Windows NT3.51 running IIS3. This suffered from a host of serious technical problems which had to be solved by either writing replacement code (e.g. the system uses its own session manager rather than the one provided by IIS) or by delegating operations to other platforms. A Linux based accelerator sits between the Windows cluster and the Internet and this provides a range of other services which were unavailable or unusable on Windows NT3.51. All this ran on a large collection of commodity servers which grew rapidly as the userbase expanded and came to include specialist hardware such as a NetApp filer. Today, things have moved on and ZyWeb runs on a relatively small cluster of modern servers with current editions of Windows which do not suffer nearly as many problems. However an updated Linux accelerator remains in place and continues to provide important additional services, particularly email management.

== See also ==
- Codelobster
- BrowserStack
