= Messier 52 =

Open cluster in the constellation Cassiopeia

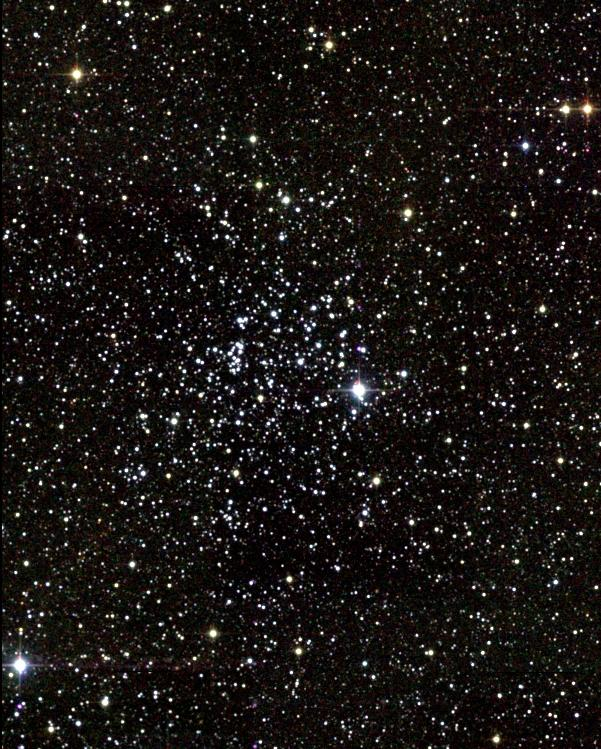
- Open cluster Messier 52 in Cassiopeia

Observation data (J2000 epoch)
- Right ascension: 23^{h} 24^{m} 48.0^{s}
- Declination: +61° 35′ 36″
- Distance: 4.6 kly (1.4 kpc)
- Apparent magnitude (V): 7.3
- Apparent dimensions (V): 13.0′

Physical characteristics
- Mass: 1,200 M_{☉} M_{☉}
- Radius: 9.5 ly
- Estimated age: 158.5 Myr
- Other designations: NGC 7654, Cr 455, C 2322+613, OCl 260

Associations
- Constellation: Cassiopeia

Messier 52 or M52, also known as NGC 7654 or the Scorpion Cluster, is an open cluster of stars in the highly northern constellation of Cassiopeia. It was discovered by Charles Messier in 1774. (Note: September 7) It can be seen from Earth under a good night sky with binoculars. The brightness of the cluster is influenced by extinction, which is stronger in the southern half. Its metallicity is somewhat below that of the Sun, and is estimated to be [Fe/H] = −0.05 ± 0.01.

R. J. Trumpler classified the cluster appearance as II2r, indicating a rich cluster with little central concentration and a medium range in the brightness of the stars. This was later revised to I2r, denoting a dense core. The cluster has a core radius of 2.97 ± 0.46 ly (0.91 ± 0.14 pc) and a tidal radius of 42.7 ± 7.2 ly (13.1 ± 2.2 pc). It has an estimated age of 158.5 million years and a mass of 1,200 M_{☉}.

The magnitude 8.3 supergiant star BD +60°2532 is a probable member of the cluster, so too 18 candidate slowly pulsating B stars, one being a Delta (δ) Scuti variable, and three candidate Gamma Doradus (γ Dor) variables. There may also be three Be stars. The core of the cluster shows a lack of interstellar matter, which may be due to supernovae explosion(s) early in the cluster's history.

== See also ==
- List of Messier objects
