= V762 Cassiopeiae =

Red supergiant star in the constellation Cassiopeia

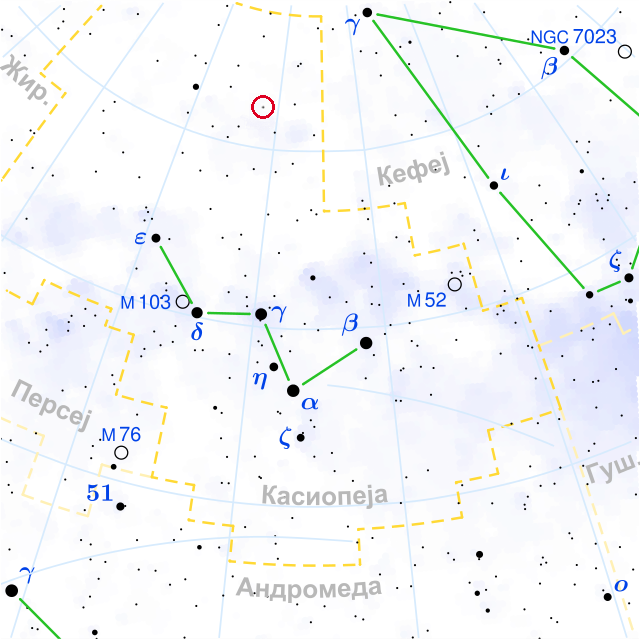
- The location of V762 Cassiopeiae

Observation data Epoch J2000.0 Equinox J2000.0
- Constellation: Cassiopeia
- Right ascension: 01^{h} 16^{m} 11.902^{s}
- Declination: +71° 44′ 37.83″
- Apparent magnitude (V): 5.82 – 5.95

Characteristics
- Evolutionary stage: RSG or AGB
- Spectral type: K5I or M3II
- Variable type: Semi-regular variable

Astrometry
Radial velocity (R_{v})	−21.37±0.91 km/s
Proper motion (μ)	RA: −1.658 mas/yr Dec.: +1.791 mas/yr
Parallax (π)	1.3148±0.0693 mas
Distance	2,500 ± 100 ly (760 ± 40 pc)

Details
Mass	16.9±2.2 M_{☉}
Radius	265.7 R_{☉}
Luminosity	14,970 L_{☉}
Surface gravity (log g)	0.90 cgs
Temperature	3,869±145 K
Metallicity [Fe/H]	−0.18 dex
Age	10.0±1.6 Myr

Other designations
- V762 Cas, BD+70 90, HD 7389, HIP 5926, HR 365, SAO 4358, TYC 4305-2038-1

Database references
SIMBAD	data

V762 Cassiopeiae is a star in the constellation of Cassiopeia. Its apparent magnitude vary between 5.82 and 5.95, which makes it faintly visible to the naked eye under dark skies. Parallax measurements give it a distance of 2,500 light-years.

== Characteristics ==
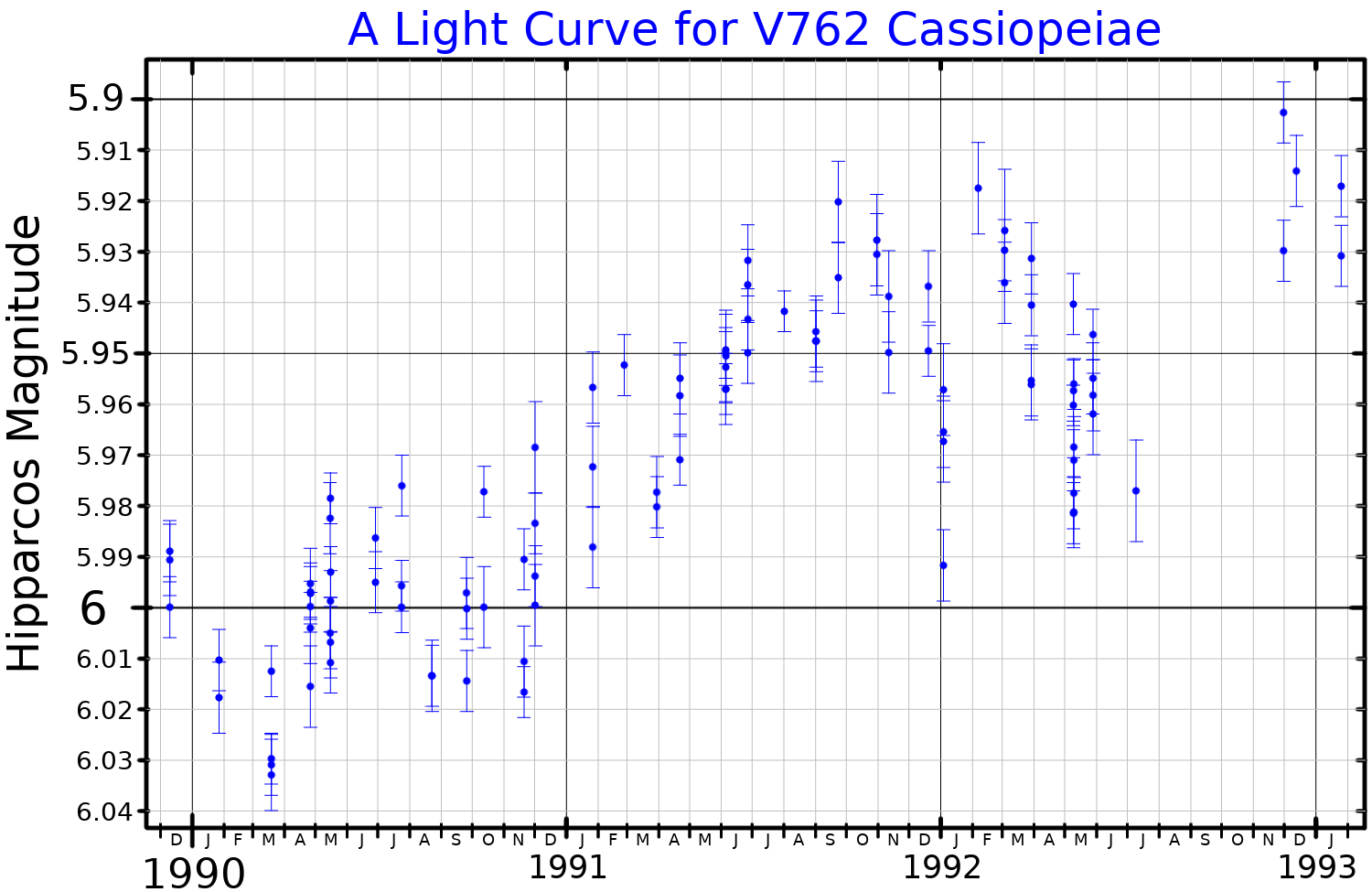
A light curve for V762 Cassiopeiae, plotted from Hipparcos data

V762 Cassiopeiae has a spectral classification of K5 I, suggesting that it is an evolved K-type red supergiant star. Other catalogues have published spectral types of K4, M, and M3II. The Bright Star Catalogue assigned a class of K1V, which originated from one of the earliest observations of this star and was adopted by the General Catalogue of Variable Stars. Recent estimates of the star's physical properties, considering its distance in excess of a thousand light-years, found that it is a red supergiant or asymptotic giant branch star.

At an estimated to be ten million years old, has around 16.9 times the Sun's mass and has expanded to 266 times the Sun's radius. It radiates 15,000 times the solar luminosity from its photosphere at an effective temperature of 3,869 K, which gives it an orange-red hue. Parallax measurements from the Gaia spacecraft show that V762 Cassiopeiae is located about 2,500 light-years away. At the estimated distance, V762 Cassiopeiae's apparent brightness is diminished by 1.04 magnitudes due to interstellar extinction.

Hipparcos satellite data showed that the star is variable, and because of that it was given the variable-star designation V762 Cassiopeiae, in 1999. The variability amplitude in visible light is only about 0.1 magnitudes. The star was catalogued as a semi-regular variable.

== Distance and titleholding ==
Some websites claim V762 Cassiopeiae is the "farthest star visible to the naked eye", at a distance of 16,300 light-years. This distance is apparently based on the first Hipparcos published parallax of 0.22±0.59 mas, approximately 5,000 pc or 16,300 light years. However, given the statistical margin of error, the distance is meaningless. The Hipparcos new reduction gives a parallax of 1.18±0.45 mas, corresponding to a distance of about 2,800 light-years, and Gaia DR3 lists a parallax of 1.3148±0.0693 mas, corresponding to a distance of about 2,500 light-years.
