= Direct (music symbol) =

Musical symbol used to indicate the first note on the next staff of the following page

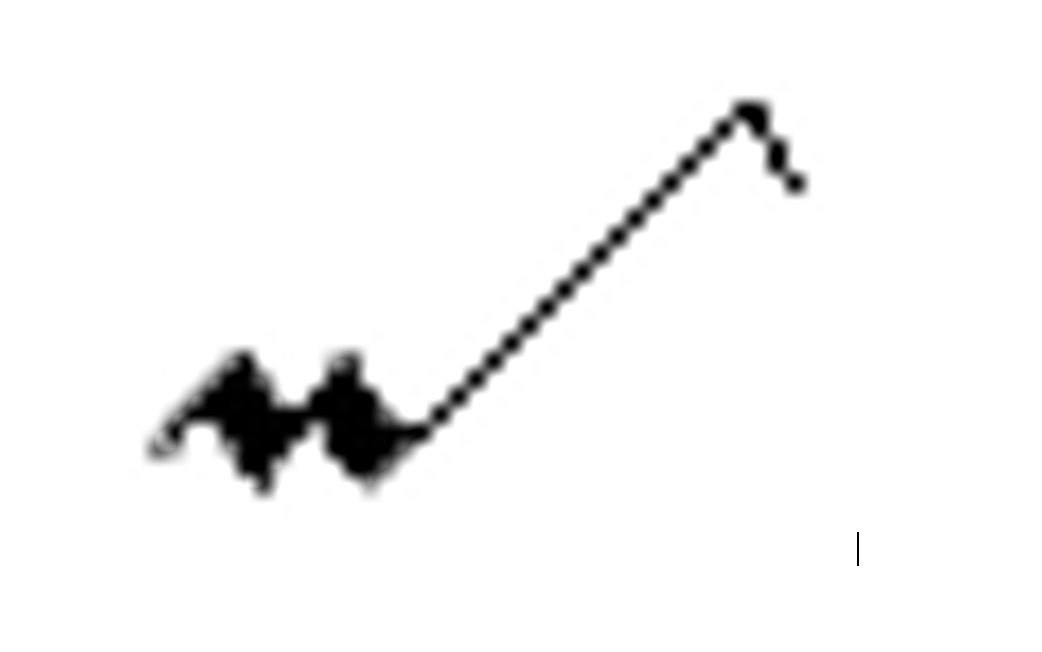
Direct symbol

A direct, also referred to by some English speaking musicians by its Italian name guida, its French name guidon, its German name wächter, or its Latin name custos, is a musical symbol used in music notation to indicate the first note on the next staff of the following page. Similar to a catchword in literary works, the direct symbol assists musicians with knowing which note is coming next during a page turn. The symbol was first used in the 11th century; sometime in place of a clef on the next line. It was later adopted into mensural notation of the 13th through 17th centuries. Though a less commonly seen symbol in modern notation, it is still used by some composers today. Some contemporary publications utilize the direct symbol to indicate a continuation rather than as a reference to a specific upcoming pitch. In these cases the symbol's meaning is comparable to an et cetera in writing. When a mordent is used the meaning of the symbol can alter slightly depending on variations in the music notation of the ornament.
