= Xi Cassiopeiae =

Binary star in the constellation Cassiopeia

- Location of ξ Cassiopeiae (circled)

Observation data Epoch J2000.0 Equinox J2000.0 (ICRS)
- Constellation: Cassiopeia
- Right ascension: 00^{h} 42^{m} 03.892^{s}
- Declination: +50° 30′ 45.12″
- Apparent magnitude (V): +4.81

Characteristics
- Spectral type: B2.5 V or B3 IV
- U−B color index: −0.60
- B−V color index: −0.11

Astrometry
Radial velocity (R_{v})	−10.6±7.4 km/s
Proper motion (μ)	RA: +16.126 mas/yr Dec.: −6.050 mas/yr
Parallax (π)	2.9022±0.2368 mas
Distance	1,120 ± 90 ly (340 ± 30 pc)
Absolute magnitude (M_{V})	−0.42

Orbit
Period (P)	940.2 d
Eccentricity (e)	0.4
Periastron epoch (T)	2441738 JD
Argument of periastron (ω) (secondary)	119°
Semi-amplitude (K_{1}) (primary)	11.90 km/s

Details
Mass	10.1±0.1 M_{☉}
Radius	4.5 R_{☉}
Luminosity	2,873 L_{☉}
Surface gravity (log g)	3.571±0.032 cgs
Temperature	15,585±250 K
Rotational velocity (v sin i)	139±7 km/s
Age	19 Myr

Other designations
- ξ Cas, 19 Cas, BD+49°164, FK5 2046, HD 3901, HIP 3300, HR 179, SAO 21637

Database references
SIMBAD	data

Xi Cassiopeiae is a blue-white hued binary star system in the northern constellation of Cassiopeia. Its name is a Bayer designation that is Latinized from ξ Cassiopeiae, and abbreviated or ξ Cas. This system has an apparent visual magnitude of +4.81 and thus is faintly visible to the naked eye. Based upon an annual parallax shift of 2.90 mas as seen from Earth, this system is located roughly 1,120 light-years (340 pc) from the Sun. At that distance, the visual magnitude of the system is diminished by an extinction factor of 0.20 due to interstellar dust. It is advancing in the general direction of the Sun with a radial velocity of roughly −10.6 km/s.

This is a single-lined spectroscopic binary star system with an orbital period of 940.2 days and an eccentricity of 0.4. The visible component has the spectrum of a B-type main-sequence star with a stellar classification of B2.5 V. It has an estimated 10.1 times the mass of the Sun and around 4.5 times the Sun's radius. At the age of 19 million years, it has a high rate of rotation with a projected rotational velocity of about 139 km/s. The star is radiating 2,873 times the Sun's luminosity from its photosphere at an effective temperature of around 15,585 K.
