= 2 Cassiopeiae =

Star in the constellation Cassiopeia

- Location of 2 Cassiopeiae (circled)

Observation data Epoch J2000.0 Equinox ICRS
- Constellation: Cassiopeia
- Right ascension: 23^{h} 09^{m} 44.1389^{s}
- Declination: +59° 19′ 57.687″
- Apparent magnitude (V): +5.679

Characteristics
- Spectral type: A4II (kA5hA7mF0)
- U−B color index: +0.31
- B−V color index: +0.33

Astrometry
Radial velocity (R_{v})	−13.58±0.15 km/s
Proper motion (μ)	RA: +0.335 mas/yr Dec.: +0.552 mas/yr
Parallax (π)	1.1900±0.0386 mas
Distance	2,740 ± 90 ly (840 ± 30 pc)
Absolute magnitude (M_{V})	−2.92

Details
Mass	5.3 M_{☉}
Radius	41 R_{☉}
Luminosity	3,014 L_{☉}
Surface gravity (log g)	1.93 cgs
Temperature	8,012 K
Metallicity [Fe/H]	−0.23 dex
Rotational velocity (v sin i)	5.3 km/s
Age	174 Myr

Other designations
- 2 Cas, HR 8822, HD 218753, BD+58°2552, HIP 114365

Database references
SIMBAD	data

2 Cassiopeiae (2 Cas) is a white bright giant in the constellation Cassiopeia, about 2,800 light years away. It is a chemically peculiar Am star.

2 Cassiopeiae has been described as an A4 type bright giant, but its spectrum is not easy to classify. The calcium K absorption lines indicate a hotter type than the hydrogen lines, while other metals indicate a cooler type, possibly as cool as F0. This makes it an Am star, a type of magnetic chemically peculiar star with unusual abundances showing in its spectrum due to chemical stratification in its atmosphere caused by slow rotation.

About six times as massive as the Sun and 3,000 times as luminous, it has expanded away from the main sequence after exhausting its core hydrogen and now has an effective temperature of about 8,000 K. Some researchers have suggested that it is a post-AGB star.

2 Cassiopeiae has a number of close companions listed in multiple star catalogues, but none are thought to be gravitationally associated.
