= HD 224355 =

Variable star in the constellation Cassiopeia

- Location of HD 224355 (circled)

Observation data Epoch J2000.0 Equinox J2000.0
- Constellation: Cassiopeia
- Right ascension: 23^{h} 57^{m} 08.47206^{s}
- Declination: +55° 42′ 20.5393″
- Apparent magnitude (V): 5.57 - 5.68

Characteristics
- Spectral type: F6V
- Variable type: Algol

Astrometry
Proper motion (μ)	RA: −20.899±0.042 mas/yr Dec.: −12.336±0.041 mas/yr
Parallax (π)	15.7172±0.0463 mas
Distance	207.5 ± 0.6 ly (63.6 ± 0.2 pc)
Absolute magnitude (M_{V})	+1.32

Orbit
Period (P)	12.1561594±0.0000006 d
Semi-major axis (a)	32.903±0.003 R_{☉}
Eccentricity (e)	0.3115±0.0001
Inclination (i)	82.925±0.025°

Details

Primary
Mass	1.626±0.001 M_{☉}
Radius	2.570±0.021 R_{☉}
Luminosity	9.67±1.08 L_{☉}
Temperature	6,350±150 K
Age	1.9 Gyr

Secondary
Mass	1.607±0.001 M_{☉}
Radius	2.445±0.022 R_{☉}
Luminosity	9.15±0.97 L_{☉}
Temperature	6,420±150 K
Age	1.9 Gyr

Other designations
- V1022 Cas, BD+54 3076, HIP 118077, HR 9059, Boss 6148, SAO 35917

Database references
SIMBAD	data

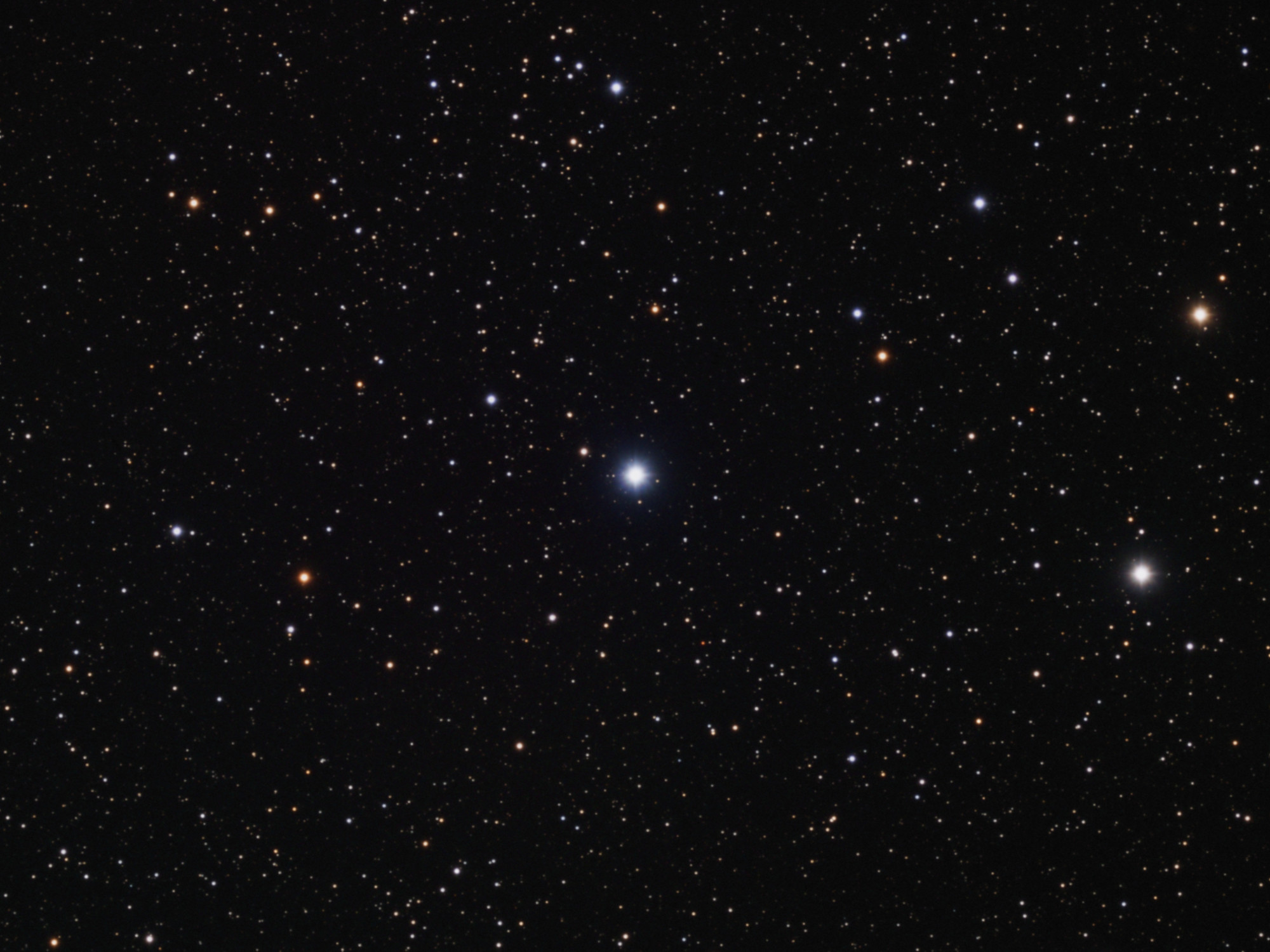
σ Cassiopeiae with HD 224355 to the right (west)

HD 224355, also known as V1022 Cassiopeiae, HR 9059 and (in early publications) Boss 6148, is an eclipsing binary star in the constellation Cassiopeia. It ranges in apparent magnitude from 5.57 to 5.68, which means it is faintly visible to the naked eye for an observer located well away from city lights. It is one of the few binaries known to be an astrometric, spectroscopic and eclipsing binary, a combination that allows the parameters of the stellar system to be calculated with high accuracy. HD 224355 lies 16′ west of the 5th-magnitude σ Cassiopeiae.

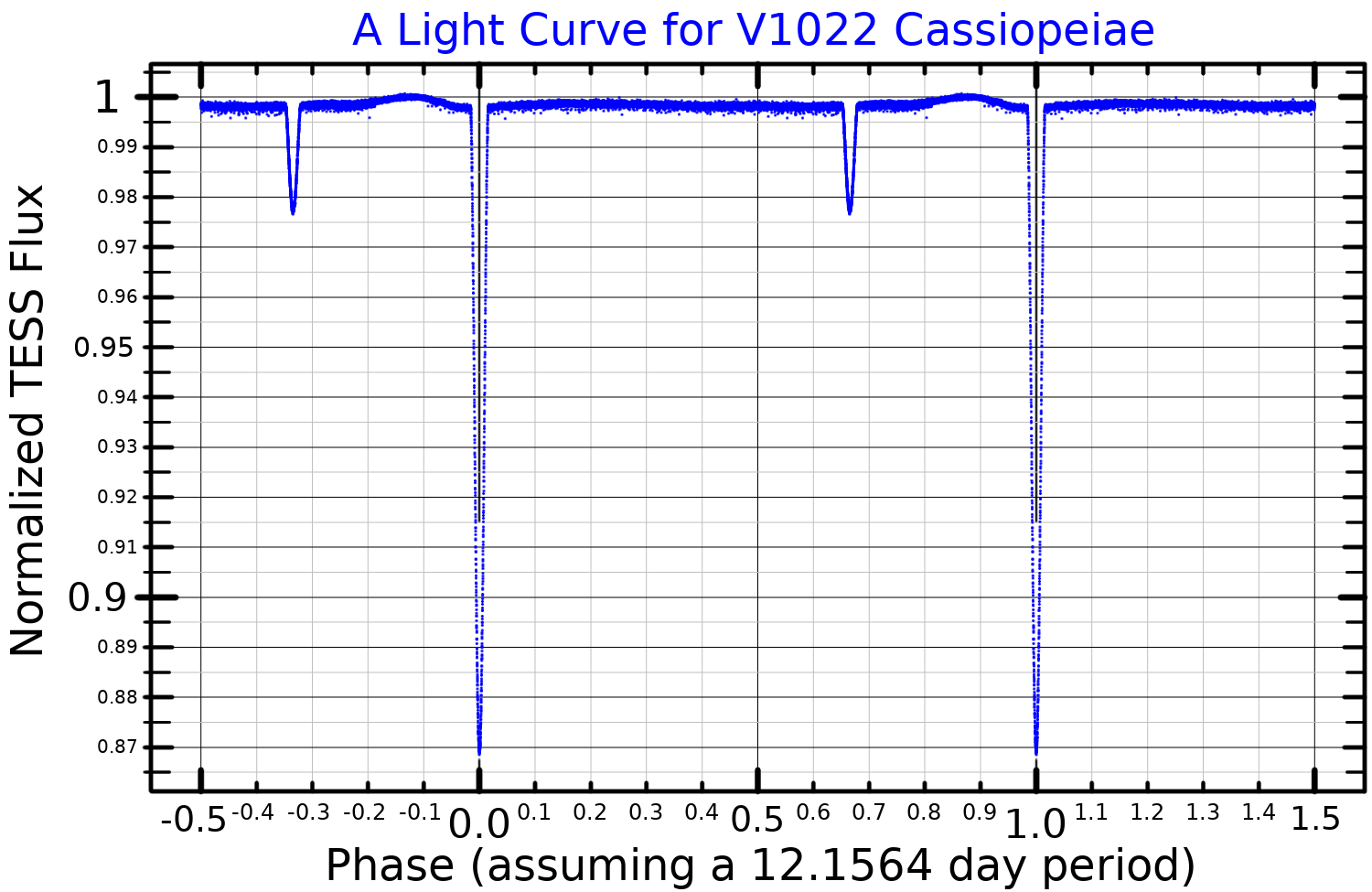
A light curve for HD 224355, plotted from TESS data

HD 224355 was discovered to be a spectroscopic binary by Harry Hemley Plaskett of the DAO, in 1919. Many additional spectra were obtained at the DAO in 1922, and orbital elements of the binary were first published in 1923. The orbit was found to have a significant eccentricity of 0.278. Because the physical separation of spectroscopic binaries is often relatively small, they are good candidates to be eclipsing binaries. For that reason, in 1924 Joel Stebbins included HD 224355 in an early photo-electric photometry study, and observed a "suspect eclipse". That led to the star being listed in the New Catalogue of Suspected Variable Stars as NSV 14773. Hipparcos data confirmed that HD 224355 is an Algol-type eclipsing binary. In 2008 it was given the variable star designation V1022 Cassiopeiae.

From 2014 through 2017, HD 224355 was observed with the CHARA optical interferometer. Those observations allowed the orbit to be directly traced from the changes of the stars' relative positions on the sky. That orbit, when combined with radial velocity information, provided a distance measurement to the star. The value obtained, 63.98±0.26 pc, agrees well with the value of 63.6±0.2 pc measured by the Gaia spacecraft using the completely independent method of stellar parallax.

Both components of the HD 224355 system are slightly more massive than the Sun, F5 or F6 stars 1.9 billion years old and right at the end of their main sequence lives. Each is about 2.5 times the radius of the Sun and 9 or 10 times as luminous, and they have effective temperatures around 6,400 K.
