= Chi Cassiopeiae =

Star in the constellation Cassiopeia

χ Cassiopeiae
- Location of χ Cassiopeiae (circled)

Observation data Epoch J2000.0 Equinox J2000.0 (ICRS)
- Constellation: Cassiopeia
- Right ascension: 01^{h} 33^{m} 55.881^{s}
- Declination: +59° 13′ 55.39″
- Apparent magnitude (V): +4.696

Characteristics
- Evolutionary stage: red clump
- Spectral type: G9 IIIb
- U−B color index: +0.762
- B−V color index: +0.997

Astrometry
Radial velocity (R_{v})	+6.66±0.14 km/s
Proper motion (μ)	RA: −44.188 mas/yr Dec.: −18.538 mas/yr
Parallax (π)	16.2553±0.095 mas
Distance	201 ± 1 ly (61.5 ± 0.4 pc)
Absolute magnitude (M_{V})	+0.52

Details
Mass	2.04 M_{☉}
Radius	10.27±0.32 R_{☉}
Luminosity	67.6 L_{☉}
Surface gravity (log g)	2.21 cgs
Temperature	4,746 K
Metallicity [Fe/H]	−0.34 dex
Rotational velocity (v sin i)	0.44±0.45 km/s
Age	1.0 Gyr

Other designations
- χ Cas, 39 Cas, BD+58°260, HD 9408, HIP 7294, HR 442, SAO 22397

Database references
SIMBAD	data

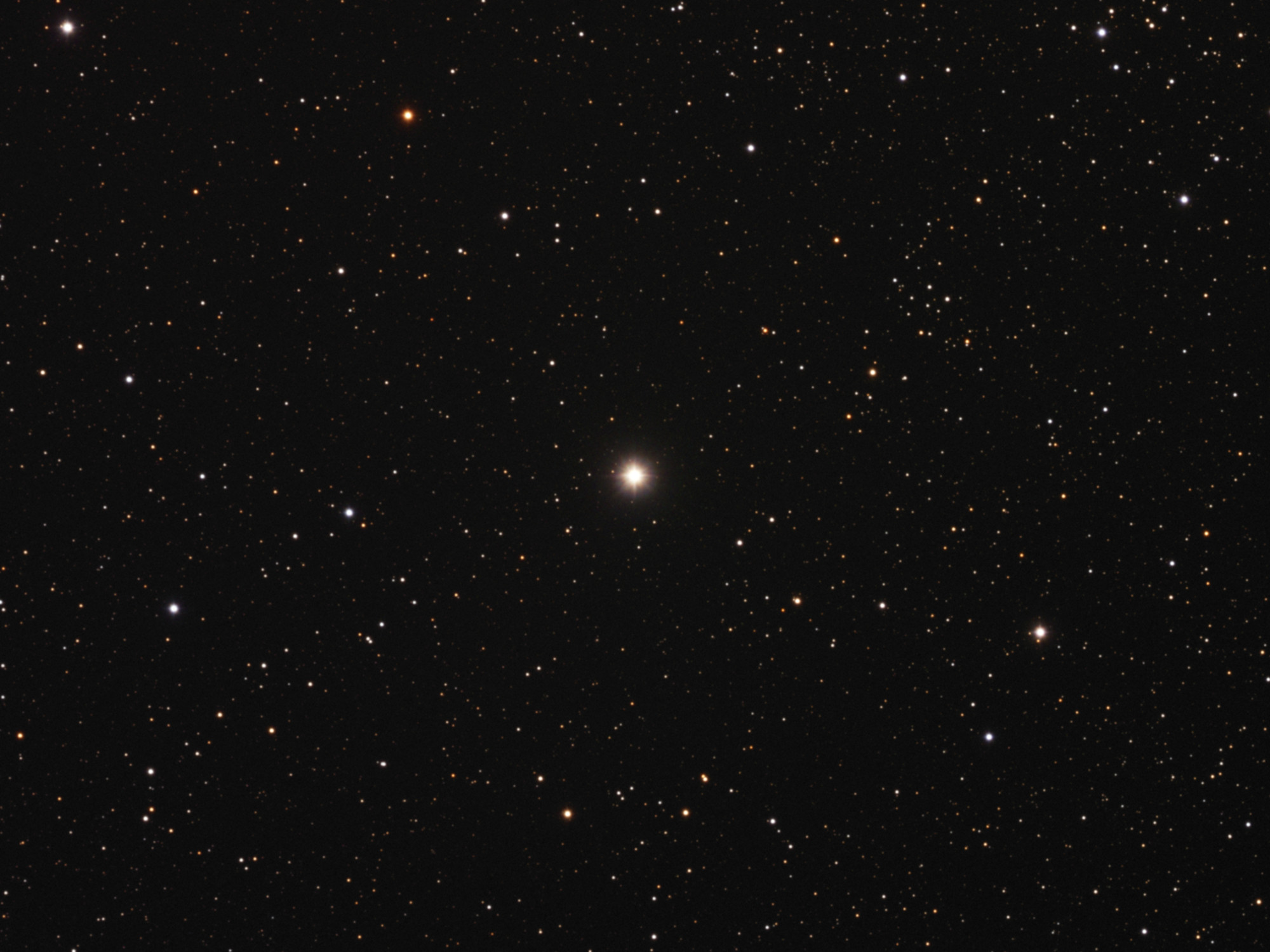
χ Cassiopeiae in optical light

Chi Cassiopeiae is a solitary, yellow-hued star in the constellation Cassiopeia. Its name is a Bayer designation that is Latinized from χ Cassiopeiae, and is abbreviated Chi Cas or χ Cas. This star is visible to the naked eye with an apparent visual magnitude of +4.7. Based upon an annual parallax shift of 16.26 mas as seen from Earth, this system is located approximately 201 light-years (62 pc) from the Sun. At that distance, the visual magnitude is diminished by an extinction of 0.18 due to interstellar dust.

With a stellar classification of G9 IIIb, it has the spectrum of an evolved, G-type giant star. It is a red clump star that it is generating energy through helium fusion at its core, with an estimated age of a billion years. The star has about double the mass of the Sun and has expanded to 10.3 times the Sun's radius. It is radiating 67.6 times the Sun's luminosity from its photosphere at an effective temperature of 4,746 K.
