= 9 Cassiopeiae =

Star in the constellation Cassiopeia

- Location of 9 Cassiopeiae (circled)

Observation data Epoch J2000.0 Equinox ICRS
- Constellation: Cassiopeia
- Right ascension: 00^{h} 04^{m} 13.6625^{s}
- Declination: +62° 17′ 15.591″
- Apparent magnitude (V): +5.884

Characteristics
- Spectral type: A1II-III
- U−B color index: +0.29
- B−V color index: +0.30

Astrometry
Radial velocity (R_{v})	−23.43±0.16 km/s
Proper motion (μ)	RA: −0.936 mas/yr Dec.: −0.263 mas/yr
Parallax (π)	1.3781±0.0237 mas
Distance	2,370 ± 40 ly (730 ± 10 pc)

Details
Mass	5.1 M_{☉}
Radius	26 R_{☉}
Luminosity	2,208 L_{☉}
Surface gravity (log g)	2.08 cgs
Temperature	7,719 K
Metallicity [Fe/H]	−0.32 dex
Rotational velocity (v sin i)	33 km/s
Age	25.1 Myr

Other designations
- 9 Cas, HR 9100, HD 225180, BD+61°2586, HIP 330

Database references
SIMBAD	data

9 Cassiopeiae (9 Cas) is a white giant star in the constellation Cassiopeia, about 2,370 light years away.

9 Cassiopeiae is classified as an A1 type giant or bright giant. One study noted peculiarities in the spectrum that could indicate a λ Boötis star, but other researchers have refuted this.

At an age of 25 million years, 9 Cassiopeiae has expanded away from the main sequence after exhausting its core hydrogen and now has a radius about 26 times that of the Sun. With an effective temperature of about 7,700 K, it emits more than two thousand times the luminosity of the Sun.

9 Cassiopeiae has a number of faint companions listed in multiple star catalogues, but they all appear to be at different distances and none are thought to be gravitationally associated.
