= 10 Cassiopeiae =

Star in the constellation Cassiopeia

- Location of 10 Cassiopeiae (circled)

Observation data Epoch J2000.0 Equinox J2000.0
- Constellation: Cassiopeia
- Right ascension: 00^{h} 06^{m} 26.5374^{s}
- Declination: +64° 11′ 46.169″
- Apparent magnitude (V): 5.54 - 5.59

Characteristics
- Spectral type: B9IIIe
- U−B color index: −0.19
- B−V color index: −0.03
- Variable type: suspected Be

Astrometry
Radial velocity (R_{v})	−0.61±0.54 km/s
Proper motion (μ)	RA: +9.248 mas/yr Dec.: +0.828 mas/yr
Parallax (π)	3.4070±0.0536 mas
Distance	960 ± 20 ly (294 ± 5 pc)
Absolute magnitude (M_{V})	−1.863

Details
Mass	3.2 M_{☉}
Radius	8.3 R_{☉}
Luminosity	920 L_{☉}
Surface gravity (log g)	2.08 cgs
Temperature	11,351 K
Metallicity [Fe/H]	−0.01 dex
Rotation	1.07 d
Rotational velocity (v sin i)	125 km/s
Age	218 Myr

Other designations
- 10 Cas, HR 7, HD 144, BD+63°2107, HIP 531, NSV 15021, MWC 2

Database references
SIMBAD	data

10 Cassiopeiae (10 Cas) is a blue-white giant star in the constellation Cassiopeia, about 960 light years away.

10 Cassiopeiae is a B9 giant star. It shows emission lines in its spectrum and is classified as a Be star. It shows slight variations in its brightness, between magnitudes 5.54 and 5.59.

At an age of 218 million years, 10 Cassiopeiae has expanded away from the main sequence after exhausting its core hydrogen and now has a radius about eight times that of the Sun. With an effective temperature of about 11,000 K, it emits nearly a thousand times the luminosity of the Sun.
