= 1 Cassiopeiae =

Star in the constellation Cassiopeia

- Location of 1 Cassiopeiae (circled in red)

Observation data Epoch J2000.0 Equinox ICRS
- Constellation: Cassiopeia
- Right ascension: 23^{h} 06^{m} 36.818^{s}
- Declination: +59° 25′ 11.14″
- Apparent magnitude (V): +4.84

Characteristics
- Spectral type: B0.5 III
- U−B color index: −0.87
- B−V color index: −0.060±0.004

Astrometry
Radial velocity (R_{v})	−9.1±0.9 km/s
Proper motion (μ)	RA: 6.94±0.14 mas/yr Dec.: −1.95±0.14 mas/yr
Parallax (π)	2.89±0.13 mas
Distance	1,130 ± 50 ly (350 ± 20 pc)
Absolute magnitude (M_{V})	−2.91

Details
Mass	13.1 M_{☉}
Radius	10.2 R_{☉}
Luminosity	18,200 L_{☉}
Surface gravity (log g)	3.98 cgs
Temperature	27,200 K
Metallicity [Fe/H]	−0.40 dex
Rotational velocity (v sin i)	31 km/s
Age	5.7±0.1 Myr

Other designations
- 1 Cas, BD+58°2545, FK5 1201, HD 218376, HIP 114104, HR 8797, SAO 35147

Database references
SIMBAD	data

1 Cassiopeiae is a single star in the northern constellation of Cassiopeia, located around 1,130 light years from the Sun. It is visible to the naked eye as a faint, blue-white hued star with an apparent visual magnitude of +4.84. This object is moving closer to the Earth with a heliocentric radial velocity of −9 km/s.

The stellar classification of 1 Cassiopeiae is B0.5 III, matching an evolved B-type giant star. It is 5.7 million years old with a projected rotational velocity of 31. The star has 13.1 times the mass of the Sun and 10.2 times the Sun's radius. It is radiating 18,200 times the Sun's luminosity from its photosphere at an effective temperature of 27,200 K.
