= Omega Cassiopeiae =

Binary star system in constellation Cassiopeia

ω Cassiopeiae
- Location of ω Cassiopeiae (circled)

Observation data Epoch J2000.0 Equinox J2000.0 (ICRS)
- Constellation: Cassiopeia
- Right ascension: 01^{h} 56^{m} 00.02830^{s}
- Declination: +68° 41′ 06.8639″
- Apparent magnitude (V): +4.99

Characteristics
- Spectral type: B5 III
- U−B color index: −0.41
- B−V color index: −0.09

Astrometry
Radial velocity (R_{v})	−24.8±4.2 km/s
Proper motion (μ)	RA: 15.067 mas/yr Dec.: −10.313 mas/yr
Parallax (π)	4.4802±0.0912 mas
Distance	730 ± 10 ly (223 ± 5 pc)
Absolute magnitude (M_{V})	+0.09

Orbit
Period (P)	69.92 d
Eccentricity (e)	0.30
Periastron epoch (T)	2420426.02 JD
Argument of periastron (ω) (secondary)	50°
Semi-amplitude (K_{1}) (primary)	29.6 km/s

Details

ω Cas A
Mass	3.5 M_{☉}
Radius	2.7 R_{☉}
Luminosity	178 L_{☉}
Surface gravity (log g)	4.1 cgs
Temperature	12,737±100 K
Rotational velocity (v sin i)	45.7 km/s
Age	232 Myr

Other designations
- ω Cas, 46 Cas, BD+67°169, FK5 2129, HD 11529, HIP 9009, HR 548, SAO 12038

Database references
SIMBAD	data

Omega Cassiopeiae is a binary star system in the northern constellation of Cassiopeia. Its name is a Bayer designation that is Latinized from ω Cassiopeiae, and abbreviated Omega Cas or ω Cas. This system has a combined apparent visual magnitude of +4.99, which means it is a faint star but visible to the naked eye. Based upon an annual parallax shift of 4.48 mas as seen from Earth, this system is located roughly 730 light years from the Sun. At that distance, the visual magnitude is diminished by an extinction of 0.16 due to interstellar dust.

This is a single-lined spectroscopic binary star system with an orbital period of 69.92 days and an eccentricity of 0.30. The visible component has the spectrum of an evolved, B-type giant star with a stellar classification of B5 III. It is a helium-weak star, a type of chemically peculiar star that displays abnormally weak absorption lines of helium for a star of its temperature. Omega Cassiopeiae has an estimated 3.5 times the mass of the Sun and is radiating 178 times the Sun's luminosity from its photosphere at an effective temperature of around 12,737 K.
