= 54 Cassiopeiae =

Star in the constellation Cassiopeia

Observation data Epoch J2000 Equinox J2000
- Constellation: Cassiopeia
- Right ascension: 02^{h} 09^{m} 80.26080^{s}
- Declination: +71° 33′ 07.2268″
- Apparent magnitude (V): +6.587

Characteristics
- Evolutionary stage: Main sequence
- Spectral type: F8V

Astrometry
Radial velocity (R_{v})	0.58±0.12 km/s
Proper motion (μ)	RA: +306.91 mas/yr Dec.: −239.244 mas/yr
Parallax (π)	37.0117±0.0173 mas
Distance	88.12 ± 0.04 ly (27.02 ± 0.01 pc)
Absolute magnitude (M_{V})	+4.42

Details
Mass	0.98+0.05 −0.04 M_{☉}
Radius	1.082±0.024 R_{☉}
Luminosity	1.36±0.07 L_{☉}
Surface gravity (log g)	4.26±0.10 cgs
Temperature	6,000±50 K
Metallicity	$\begin{smallmatrix}\left[\ce{M}/\ce{H}\right]\end{smallmatrix}$ = −0.24±0.08
Rotational velocity (v sin i)	6 km/s
Age	5.7+1.7 −1.9 Gyr

Other designations
- 54 Cas, BD+70 163, HD 12800, HIP 10031, G 244-50

Database references
SIMBAD	data

54 Cassiopeiae is a star in the northern constellation Cassiopeia. Located 88 ly (27 pc) from Earth, it has an apparent magnitude of 6.59, which makes it hard to be seen by the naked eye even from dark skies. Its absolute magnitude is 4.4. It is a F-type main-sequence star with a stellar classification F8V, currently fusing atoms of hydrogen into helium at its core.

Astrometric measurements by the Gaia spacecraft suggested the presence of a planetary companion to 54 Cassiopeiae, seven times more massive than Jupiter and with an orbital period of 401 days (1.10 years). This was later rejected by the Gaia team as a false positive caused by a software error. Radial velocity observations also show no evidence for this planet.
