= 48 Cassiopeiae =

Triple star system in the constellation Cassiopeia

- Location of 48 Cassiopeiae (circled in red)

Observation data Epoch J2000 Equinox ICRS
- Constellation: Cassiopeia
- Right ascension: 02^{h} 01^{m} 57.45035^{s}
- Declination: +70° 54′ 25.2902″
- Apparent magnitude (V): 4.49

Characteristics
- Spectral type: A3 Va (A2 V + F2 V)
- B−V color index: 0.164±0.008

Astrometry
Radial velocity (R_{v})	−12.4 km/s
Proper motion (μ)	RA: −55.69 mas/yr Dec.: −8.71 mas/yr
Parallax (π)	28.36±0.44 mas
Distance	115 ± 2 ly (35.3 ± 0.5 pc)
Absolute magnitude (M_{V})	1.75

Orbit
Primary	48 Cas A
Name	48 Cas B
Period (P)	61.14±0.05 yr
Semi-major axis (a)	0.614±0.002″
Eccentricity (e)	0.355±0.001
Inclination (i)	16.7±0.9°
Longitude of the node (Ω)	48.2±3.2°
Periastron epoch (T)	1964.35±0.09
Argument of periastron (ω) (secondary)	19.5±3.6°

Details

48 Cas A
Mass	1.93 M_{☉}
Luminosity	17.8+0.6 −1.2 L_{☉}
Surface gravity (log g)	4.47 cgs
Temperature	8,538±290 K
Metallicity [Fe/H]	−0.4 dex
Rotational velocity (v sin i)	61 km/s
Age	376 Myr

48 Cas B
Mass	1.17 M_{☉}

Other designations
- A Cassiopeiae, 48 Cas, BD+70°153, HD 12111, HIP 9480, HR 575, SAO 4554, ADS 1598, CCDM J02020+7054, WDS J02020+7054AB

Database references
SIMBAD	data

48 Cassiopeiae is a triple star system in the northern constellation of Cassiopeia. It is visible to the naked eye with a combined apparent visual magnitude of 4.49. With an annual parallax shift of 28.36±0.44 mas as seen from Earth's orbit, it is located approximately 115 light years away. The system is moving closer with a heliocentric radial velocity of −12.4 km/s.

The primary component, designated 48 Cassiopeiae A, is a white A-type main-sequence star with a stellar classification of A2 V and an apparent magnitude of +4.65. It has a companion, component B, which is an F-type main-sequence star of class F2 V and an apparent magnitude of +6.74. This pair orbit around their common centre of mass once every 61.1 years. They have a semimajor axis of 0.614 arcseconds and an eccentricity of 0.355. A third companion, component C, is a magnitude 13.20 star located at an angular separation of 23.16 arcseconds as of 2014, or at least 816.5 AU away.

48 Cassiopeiae also has the Bayer designation A Cassiopeiae, the only star with a Latin letter designation in the constellation.
