= 2 Ursae Minoris =

Star in the constellation Cepheus

- Location of 2 Ursae Minoris (circled in red)

Observation data Epoch J2000 Equinox ICRS
- Constellation: Cepheus
- Right ascension: 01^{h} 08^{m} 44.88005^{s}
- Declination: +86° 15′ 25.5240″
- Apparent magnitude (V): 4.244

Characteristics
- Evolutionary stage: red giant branch
- Spectral type: K2 II-III
- B−V color index: 1.213±0.012

Astrometry
Radial velocity (R_{v})	+8.36±0.19 km/s
Proper motion (μ)	RA: 80.65±0.16 mas/yr Dec.: −11.54±0.17 mas/yr
Parallax (π)	11.64±0.15 mas
Distance	280 ± 4 ly (86 ± 1 pc)
Absolute magnitude (M_{V})	−0.43

Details
Mass	2.27±0.41 M_{☉}
Radius	21.1 R_{☉}
Luminosity	187 L_{☉}
Surface gravity (log g)	2.48±0.17 cgs
Temperature	4,419 K
Metallicity [Fe/H]	0.068±0.010 dex
Rotational velocity (v sin i)	1.0 km/s
Age	972 Myr

Other designations
- Tarandus, 2 UMi, BD+85°19, FK5 906, HD 5848, HIP 5372, HR 285, SAO 181

Database references
SIMBAD	data

2 Ursae Minoris (2 UMi), also named Tarandus, is a single star a few degrees away from the northern celestial pole. Despite its Flamsteed designation, the star is actually located in the constellation Cepheus. This change occurred when the constellation boundaries were formally set in 1930 by Eugene Delporte. Therefore, the star is usually referred to by its catalog numbers such as HR 285 or HD 5848. It is visible to the naked eye as a faint, orange-hued star with an apparent visual magnitude of 4.244. This object is located 280 light years away and is moving further from the Earth with a heliocentric radial velocity of +8 km/s. It is a candidate member of the Hyades Supercluster.

This is an aging K-type star with a stellar classification of K2 II-III, showing a luminosity class with blended traits of a giant and a bright giant. It has 2.3 times the mass of the Sun and has expanded to 21 times the Sun's radius. The star is radiating around 187 times the Sun's luminosity from its enlarged photosphere at an effective temperature of 4,419 K.

This star was part of the now-obsolete constellation Rangifer, the reindeer, which was also called Tarandus. Both words mean reindeer in Latin, and they form the reindeer's scientific name, Rangifer tarandus. The IAU Working Group on Star Names approved the name Tarandus for this star on 25 December 2025, and it is now so entered in the IAU Catalog of Star Names. 49 Cassiopeiae A was given the proper name Rangifer.
