= BE Camelopardalis =

Variable star in the Camelopardalis constellation

- Location of BE Camelopardalis (circled in red)

Observation data Epoch J2000 Equinox ICRS
- Constellation: Camelopardalis
- Right ascension: 03^{h} 49^{m} 31.27755^{s}
- Declination: +65° 31′ 33.5258″
- Apparent magnitude (V): 4.39 (4.35 - 4.48)

Characteristics
- Evolutionary stage: asymptotic giant branch
- Spectral type: M2 II
- B−V color index: 1.870±0.029
- Variable type: Lc

Astrometry
Radial velocity (R_{v})	−1.70±1.47 km/s
Proper motion (μ)	RA: +0.319 mas/yr Dec.: −15.593 mas/yr
Parallax (π)	3.3288±0.1874 mas
Distance	958+53 −51 ly (293.7+16.4 −15.5 pc)
Absolute magnitude (M_{V})	−2.51

Details
Mass	2.93 M_{☉}
Radius	250 R_{☉}
Luminosity	10,600 L_{☉}
Temperature	3,660 K

Other designations
- Custos, BE Cam, BD+65°369, HD 23475, HIP 17884, HR 1155, SAO 12916

Database references
SIMBAD	data

BE Camelopardalis, also named Custos, is a solitary variable star in the northern circumpolar constellation of Camelopardalis. It is visible to the naked eye as a faint, red-hued point of light with an apparent visual magnitude that fluctuates around 4.39. The star is located roughly 960 light years away.

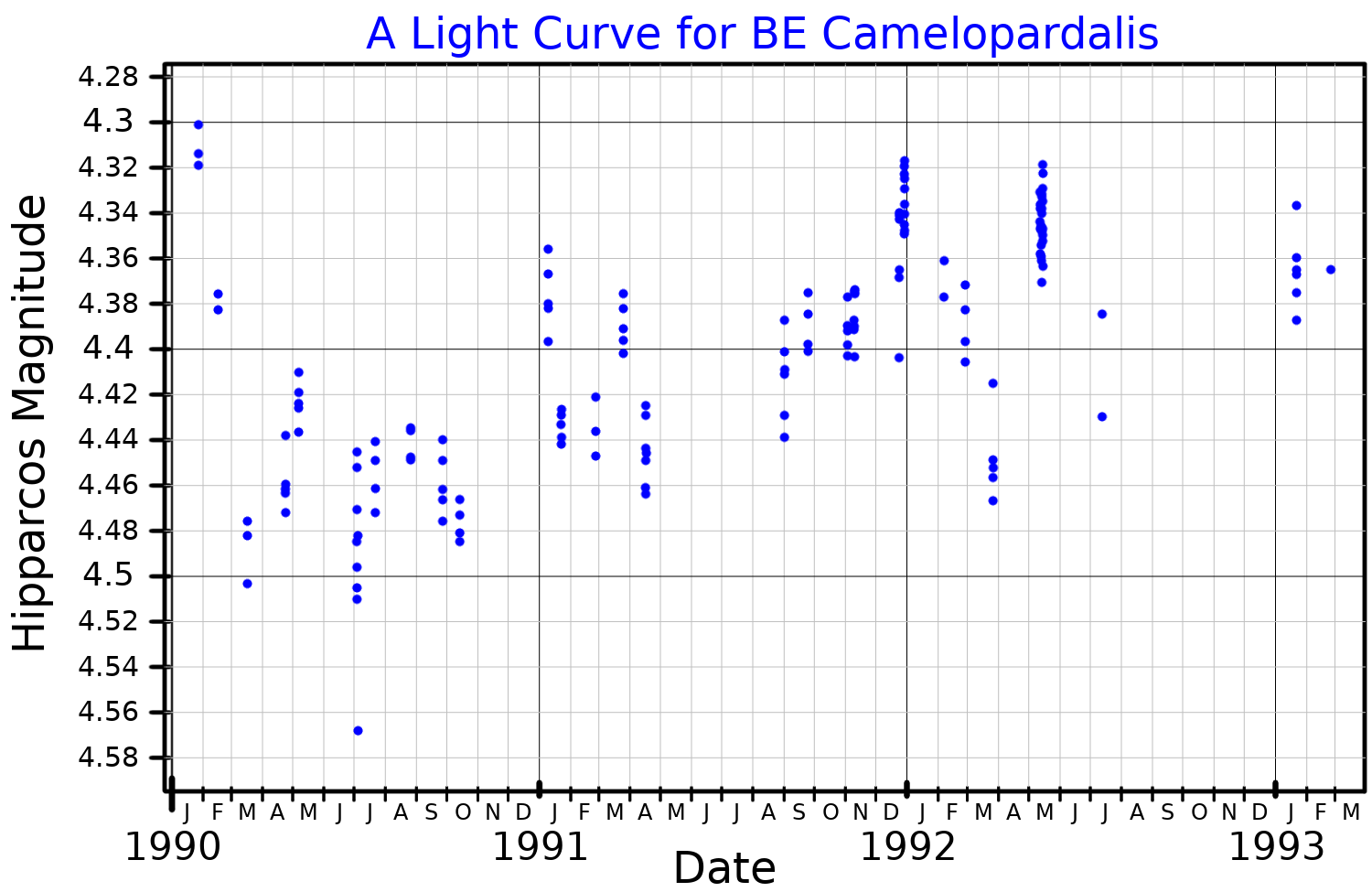
A light curve for BE Camelopardalis, plotted from Hipparcos data

This object is an M-type bright giant with a stellar classification of M2 II, and is currently on the asymptotic giant branch. In 1928, Joel Stebbins and Charles Morse Huffer announced that the star, then called HR 1155, is a variable star, based on observations made at Washburn Observatory. It was given its variable star designation, BE Camelopardalis, in 1977. It is classified as an irregular variable of subtype Lc and its brightness varies from magnitude +4.35 down to +4.48. Having exhausted the supply of hydrogen at its core, the star has expanded to around 250 times the Sun's radius. It has 2.9 times the Sun's mass and is radiating over 10,000 times the luminosity of the Sun from its enlarged photosphere at an effective temperature of 3,660 K.

This star was part of the now-obsolete constellation Custos Messium, the Harvest Keeper, which was named as a pun on Charles Messier. The IAU Working Group on Star Names approved the name Custos for this star on 25 December 2025, after the obsolete constellation, and it is now so entered in the IAU Catalog of Star Names. The brightest star of Custos Messium, 50 Cassiopeiae, was given the proper name Gang after a Chinese constellation.
