= HD 15920 =

Giant star in the constellation Cassiopeia

Observation data Epoch J2000.0 Equinox ICRS
- Constellation: Cassiopeia
- Right ascension: 02^{h} 38^{m} 02.03317^{s}
- Declination: +72° 49′ 05.7106″
- Apparent magnitude (V): 5.17

Characteristics
- Evolutionary stage: red giant branch
- Spectral type: G8III
- B−V color index: +0.896±0.003

Astrometry
Radial velocity (R_{v})	−3.81±0.12 km/s
Proper motion (μ)	RA: −27.072 mas/yr Dec.: +15.618 mas/yr
Parallax (π)	12.1337±0.0717 mas
Distance	269 ± 2 ly (82.4 ± 0.5 pc)
Absolute magnitude (M_{V})	0.70

Details
Mass	2.55±0.68 M_{☉}
Radius	10.26±0.73 R_{☉}
Luminosity	64+6 −5 L_{☉}
Surface gravity (log g)	2.91±0.11 cgs
Temperature	5,104±148 K
Metallicity [Fe/H]	0.02±0.05 dex
Age	977+198 −164 Myr

Other designations
- BD+72°140, FK5 87, GC 3116, HD 15920, HIP 12273, HR 743, SAO 4694, GSC 04320-02109

Database references
SIMBAD	data

HD 15920 is a single star in the northern constellation of Cassiopeia. It has a yellow hue and is visible to the naked eye as a dim point of light with an apparent visual magnitude of 5.17. This object is located at a distance of approximately 269 light years from the Sun based on parallax, but it is drifting closer with a radial velocity of −4 km/s.

This object is an aging giant star with a stellar classification of G8III. After exhausting the supply of hydrogen at its core, this star has cooled and expanded off the main sequence – at present it has ten times the girth of the Sun. The star is around a billion years old with 2.6 times the mass of the Sun. It is radiating 64 times the Sun's luminosity from its swollen photosphere at an effective temperature of 5,104 K. HD 15920 is the most likely source for the X-ray emission detected at these coordinates.
