= 12 Cassiopeiae =

Star in the constellation Cassiopeia

- Location of 12 Cassiopeiae (circled)

Observation data Epoch J2000.0 Equinox ICRS
- Constellation: Cassiopeia
- Right ascension: 00^{h} 24^{m} 47.5055^{s}
- Declination: +61° 49′ 51.808″
- Apparent magnitude (V): +5.377

Characteristics
- Spectral type: B9III
- U−B color index: −0.16
- B−V color index: +0.00

Astrometry
| Radial velocity (R_{v}) | −1.76±0.60 km/s |
| Proper motion (μ) | RA: +14.126 mas/yr Dec.: −2.715 mas/yr |
| Parallax (π) | 3.8102±0.0612 mas |
| Distance | 860 ± 10 ly (262 ± 4 pc) |
| Absolute magnitude (M_{V}) | −1.27 |

Details
| Mass | 3.1 M_{☉} |
| Radius | 5.7 R_{☉} |
| Luminosity | 386 L_{☉} |
| Surface gravity (log g) | 2.94 cgs |
| Temperature | 10,728 K |
| Metallicity [Fe/H] | −0.96 dex |
| Rotational velocity (v sin i) | 155 km/s |
| Age | 257 Myr |

Other designations
- 12 Cas, HR 93, HD 2011, BD+61°69, HIP 1960

Database references
| SIMBAD | data |

12 Cassiopeiae (12 Cas) is a white giant in the constellation Cassiopeia, about 860 light years away. It has an apparent magnitude of 5.4, so it faintly visible to the naked eye.

The spectrum of 12 Cassiopeiae is classified as a B9-type giant. About three times as massive as the Sun and 386 times as luminous, it has expanded away from the main sequence after exhausting its core hydrogen. It now has a radius of 5.7 R_{☉} with an effective temperature of about 10,728 K, leading to a bolometric luminosity of 386 L_{☉}.
