= 42 Cassiopeiae =

Star in the constellation Cassiopeia

Observation data Epoch J2000.0 Equinox ICRS
- Constellation: Cassiopeia
- Right ascension: 01^{h} 42^{m} 55.86328^{s}
- Declination: +70° 37′ 21.0921″
- Apparent magnitude (V): +5.18

Characteristics
- Evolutionary stage: main sequence
- Spectral type: B9 V
- B−V color index: −0.022±0.002
- Variable type: suspected β Per

Astrometry
Radial velocity (R_{v})	+6.6±2.9 km/s
Proper motion (μ)	RA: +76.295 mas/yr Dec.: −14.091 mas/yr
Parallax (π)	11.1166±0.0661 mas
Distance	293 ± 2 ly (90.0 ± 0.5 pc)
Absolute magnitude (M_{V})	0.53

Details
Mass	2.68±0.04 M_{☉}
Radius	2.63±0.13 R_{☉}
Luminosity	66.12 L_{☉}
Surface gravity (log g)	3.98±0.04 cgs
Temperature	10,141±61 K
Rotational velocity (v sin i)	149 km/s
Age	67+188 −57 Myr

Other designations
- 42 Cas, NSV 590, BD+69°114, GC 2059, HD 10250, HIP 8016, HR 480, SAO 4470

Database references
SIMBAD	data

42 Cassiopeiae is a possible binary star system in the northern circumpolar constellation of Cassiopeia. It is visible to the naked eye as a dim, blue-white hued star with a baseline apparent visual magnitude of +5.18. The system is located approximately 293 light years from the Sun based on parallax, and is drifting further away with a radial velocity of +7 km/s.

This is classified as a suspected eclipsing binary of the Algol type, with a period of 16.77 days and a magnitude decrease of 0.3. The primary is a B-type main-sequence star with a stellar classification of B9V. It is roughly 67 million years old and is spinning with a projected rotational velocity of 149 km/s. The star has 2.7 times the mass of the Sun and 2.6 times the Sun's radius. It is radiating 66 times the luminosity of the Sun from its photosphere at an effective temperature of 10,141 K.
