= 47 Cassiopeiae =

Star in the constellation Cassiopeia

Observation data Epoch J2000.0 Equinox ICRS
- Constellation: Cassiopeia
- Right ascension: 02^{h} 05^{m} 07.424^{s}
- Declination: +77° 16′ 52.82″
- Apparent magnitude (V): +5.3

Characteristics
- Evolutionary stage: main sequence
- Spectral type: F0Vn

Astrometry
| Radial velocity (R_{v}) | −20.3±3.6 km/s |
| Proper motion (μ) | RA: +139.92±0.45 mas/yr Dec.: −47.79±0.39 mas/yr |
| Parallax (π) | 30.16±0.45 mas |
| Distance | 108 ± 2 ly (33.2 ± 0.5 pc) |
| Absolute magnitude (M_{V}) | +2.67 |

Details
| Mass | 1,5 M_{☉} |
| Radius | 2.2 R_{☉} |
| Luminosity | 10 L_{☉} |
| Surface gravity (log g) | 4.01 cgs |
| Temperature | 6.970 K |
| Metallicity [Fe/H] | 0.03 dex |
| Rotation | 1.03 days |
| Rotational velocity (v sin i) | 206 km/s |
| Age | 1.3 Gyr |

Other designations
- 47 Cas, BD+76°63, GC 2459, HD 12230, HIP 9727, HR 581, SAO 4562

Database references
| SIMBAD | data |

47 Cassiopeiae (also designated as or called 47 Cas, HR 581, HD 12230, and HIP 9727) is an F-type main-sequence star located about 108 light-years away in the constellation of Cassiopeia. 47 Cassiopeiae is visible to the naked eye in dark skies and is almost never visible in areas with light pollution.

The star forms a binary with an unseen companion, 47 Cassiopeiae B, detected only in the radio spectrum. The star, despite being poorly known, has been observed to emit X-rays and microwaves in large flares. It was historically catalogued as an A7V star, but later revised to F0V. Based on kinematics, this star is likely part of the Pleiades moving group. Despite being much more luminous and massive then the Sun, this star has been used as a solar analog.

The star was a bright star in the occasionally used 1775-to-19th-century constellation Custos Messium, typically drawn as a depiction of Charles Messier standing on top of the giraffe (Camelopardalis), between Cepheus and Cassiopeia.
