= Zeta Cassiopeiae =

Star in the constellation Cassiopeia

ζ Cassiopeiae
- Location of ζ Cassiopeiae (circled)

Observation data Epoch J2000 Equinox ICRS
- Constellation: Cassiopeia
- Right ascension: 00^{h} 36^{m} 58.28419^{s}
- Declination: +53° 53′ 48.8673″
- Apparent magnitude (V): 3.59 to 3.68

Characteristics
- Spectral type: B2IV
- U−B color index: −0.89
- B−V color index: −0.19
- Variable type: SPB

Astrometry
Radial velocity (R_{v})	2.0 km/s
Proper motion (μ)	RA: 17.38 mas/yr Dec.: −9.86 mas/yr
Parallax (π)	5.50±0.16 mas
Distance	590 ± 20 ly (182 ± 5 pc)
Absolute magnitude (M_{V})	−2.8

Details
Mass	8.96±0.13 M_{☉}
Radius	6.1±0.3 R_{☉}
Luminosity	7,200±900 L_{☉}
Surface gravity (log g)	3.81 cgs
Temperature	21,500±800 K
Metallicity [Fe/H]	−0.23 dex
Rotation	5.37045 days
Rotational velocity (v sin i)	17±3 km/s
Age	22.9±1.2 Myr

Other designations
- Fulu, ζ Cas, 17 Cassiopeiae, BD+53°105, FK5 17, GC 727, HD 3360, HIP 2920, HR 153, SAO 21566

Database references
SIMBAD	data

Zeta Cassiopeiae is a variable star in the constellation of Cassiopeia. It has the proper name Fulu, pronounced /ˈfuːluː/; Zeta Cassiopeiae is its Bayer designation, which is Latinized from ζ Cassiopeiae and abbreviated Zeta Cas or ζ Cas. This star has a blue-white hue and is classified as a B-type subgiant with a variable apparent magnitude of about +3.6, making it visible to the naked eye. Based upon parallax measurements, it is approximately 590 light-years from the Sun.

== Nomenclature ==
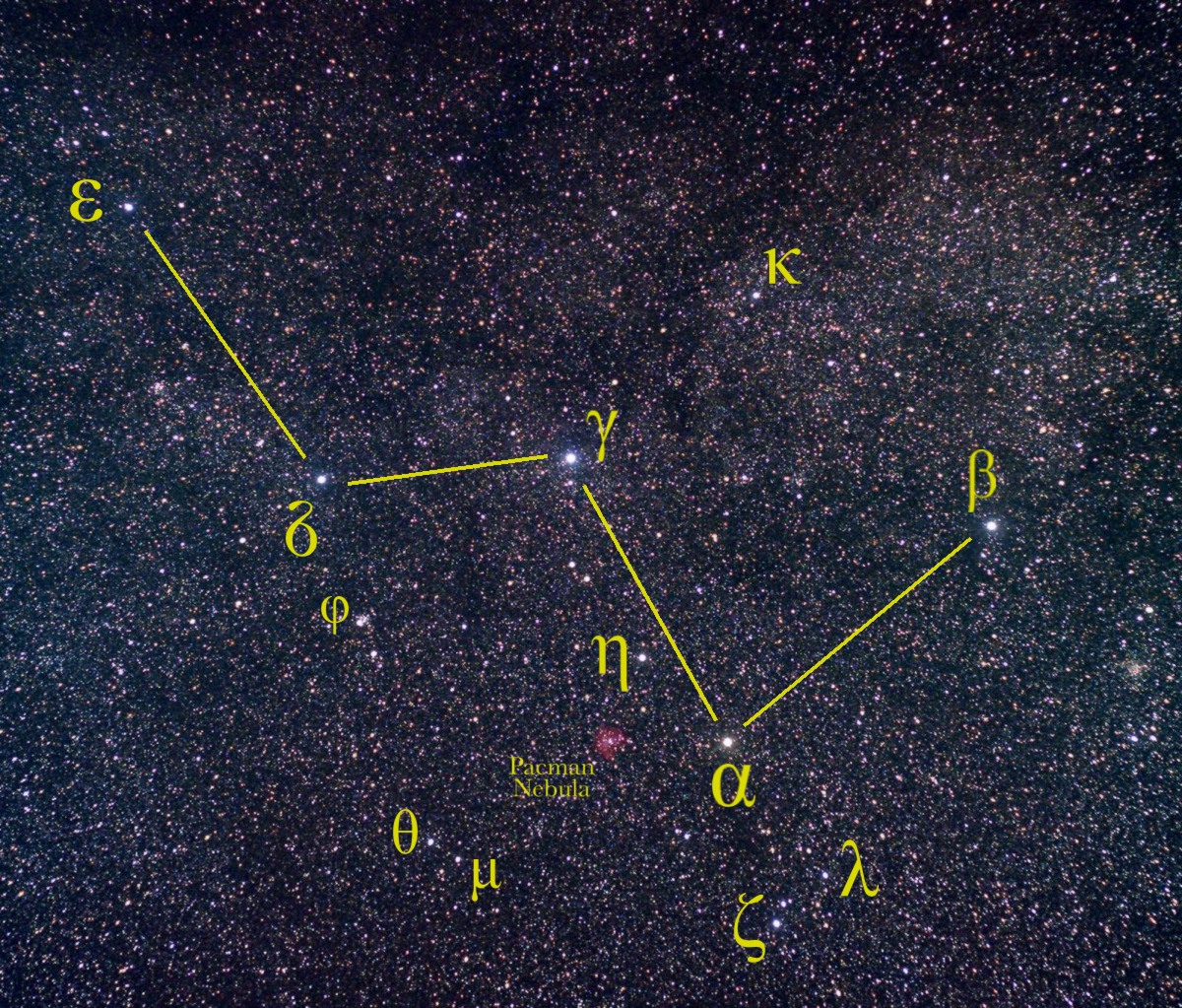
Cassiopeia starfield

ζ Cassiopeiae (Latinised to Zeta Cassiopeiae) is the star's Bayer designation.

In Chinese astronomy, Zeta Cassiopeiae is called 附路, Pinyin: Fùlù, meaning Auxiliary Road, because this star is marking itself and standing alone in the Auxiliary Road asterism, Legs (mansion) (see Chinese constellation). 附路 (Fùlù) was westernized into Foo Loo, but that name was also designated for Eta Cassiopeiae by R. H. Allen, with the meaning of "a by-path" In 2016, the IAU organized a Working Group on Star Names (WGSN) to catalog and standardize proper names for stars. The WGSN approved the name Fulu for Zeta Cassiopeiae on 30 June 2017 and it is now so included in the List of IAU-approved Star Names.

== Properties ==
At the age of 23 million years, Zeta Cassiopeiae is a B2 subgiant, indicating that it has exhausted its core hydrogen and started to evolve away from the main sequence. It has an effective temperature of over 20,000 K, with about nine times the mass of the sun, and is 7,200 times as luminous. The star is rotating about its axis once every 5.4 days.

=== Variability ===
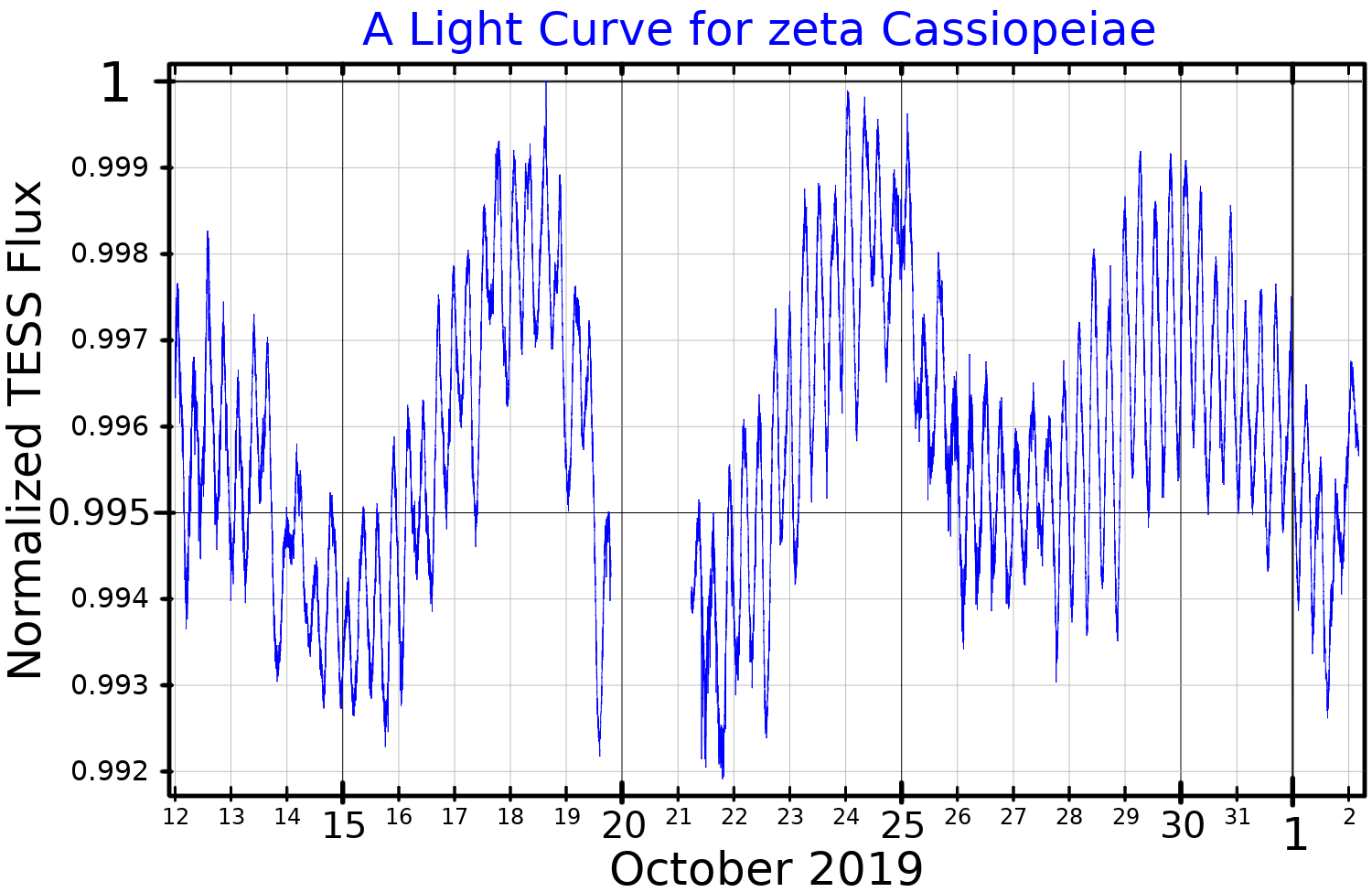
A light curve for Zeta Cassiopeiae, plotted from TESS data

Zeta Cassiopeiae is a probable member of an unusual group of variable stars known as "Slowly Pulsating B" (SPB) stars. It shows a pulsation frequency of 0.64 per day (or once every 1.56 days) and displays a weak magnetic field with a strength of roughly 3.35 × 10^{−2} T, which varies with a period of 5.37 days. This likely matches the rotation rate of the star, which, when combined with the low projected rotational velocity, indicates the star may be seen nearly pole-on. Zeta Cassiopeiae is a candidate magnetic Bp star that shows an overabundance of helium. The star contains a randomly oriented fossil magnetic field, which impacts the outflow of the stellar wind. Collisions between streams from this stellar wind creates a shock front, with cooling particles settling toward a co-rotating disk.
