= YZ Cassiopeiae =

Triple star system in the constellation Cassiopeia

YZ Cas
- Location of YZ Cassiopeiae (circled)

Observation data Epoch J2000 Equinox ICRS
- Constellation: Cassiopeia
- A
- Right ascension: 00^{h} 45^{m} 39.0777^{s}
- Declination: +74° 59′ 17.063″
- Apparent magnitude (V): 5.653
- B
- Right ascension: 00^{h} 45^{m} 42,1503^{s}
- Declination: +74° 58′ 43.242″
- Apparent magnitude (V): 11.23

Characteristics

A
- Spectral type: A2IV (A1Vm + F2V)
- U−B color index: +0.07
- B−V color index: +0.05
- Variable type: Algol

B
- Spectral type: F2V
- U−B color index: +0.64
- B−V color index: +0.94

Astrometry
Radial velocity (R_{v})	+8.90±0.4 km/s
Proper motion (μ)	RA: −15.07 mas/yr Dec.: −22.17 mas/yr
Parallax (π)	11.24±0.55 mas
Distance	103.8 pc
Absolute magnitude (M_{V})	+0.251

Orbit
Name	TYC 4307-2168-1
Period (P)	86 580 yr

Orbit
Primary	Aa
Name	Ab
Period (P)	4.467 days
Semi-major axis (a)	17.47 R_{☉}
Eccentricity (e)	0.0
Inclination (i)	88.332°

Details

Aa
Mass	2.308 M_{☉}
Radius	2.547 R_{☉}
Luminosity	41.69 L_{☉}
Surface gravity (log g)	3.988 cgs
Temperature	9,200 K
Rotational velocity (v sin i)	29.2 km/s

Ab
Mass	1.325 M_{☉}
Radius	1.359 R_{☉}
Luminosity	3.34 L_{☉}
Surface gravity (log g)	4.311 cgs
Temperature	6,890 K
Metallicity [Fe/H]	+0.10 dex
Rotational velocity (v sin i)	15.0 km/s
Age	490 - 550 Myr

Other designations
- 21 Cassiopeiae, HR 192, BD+74 27, HD 4161, SAO 4216, HIP 3572, GC 891, ADS 624 A, CCDM J00457+7459

Database references
SIMBAD	data

YZ Cassiopeiae (21 Cas) is a star system 103.8 parsecs (339 ly) away from Earth, in the constellation Cassiopeia. It comprises three stars: an eclipsing Algol-type binary and a visually fainter star about 3000 AU distant. It is faintly visible to the naked eye under good observing conditions.

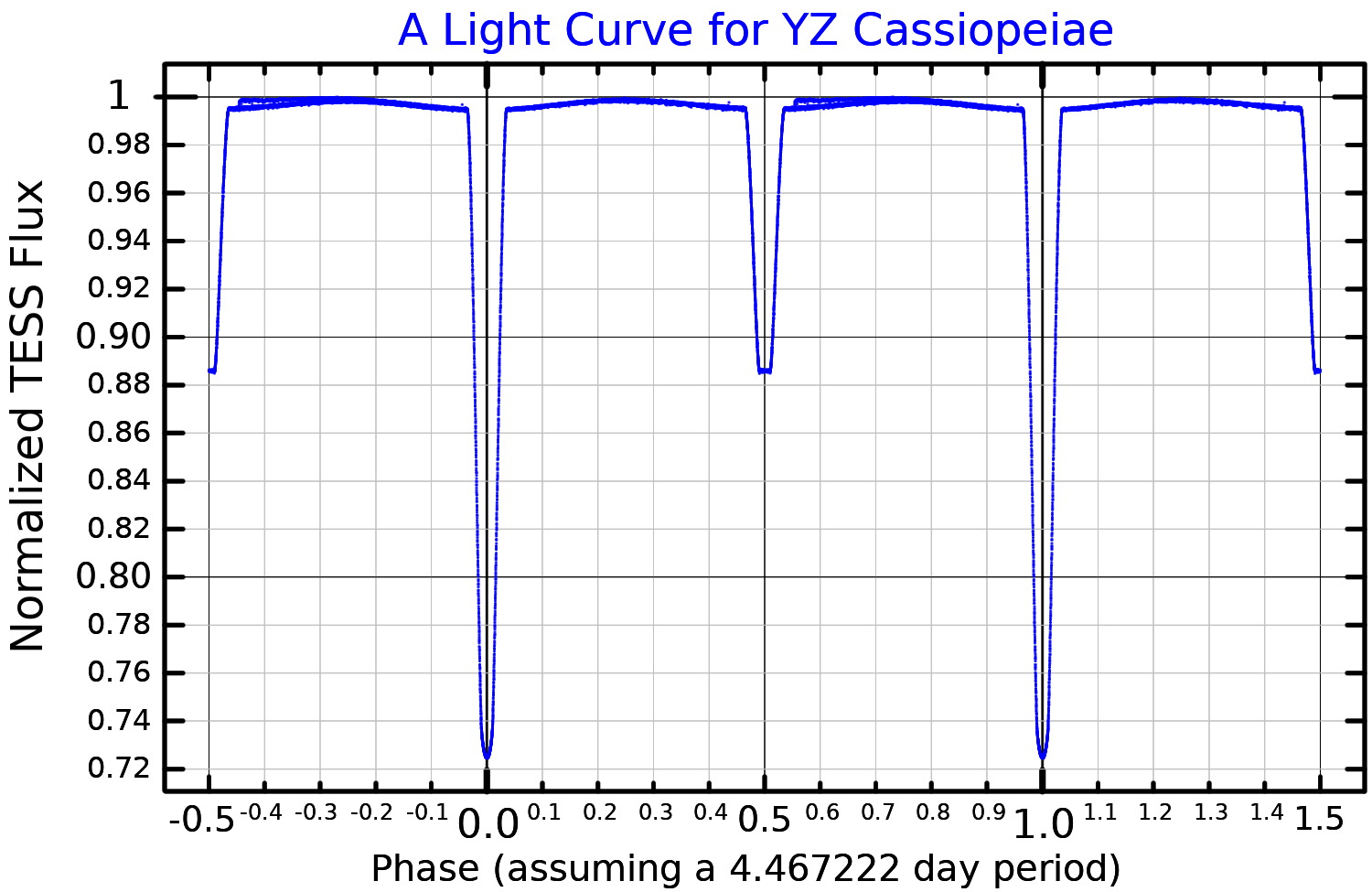
A light curve for YZ Cassiopeiae, plotted from TESS data

The primary star in the YZ Cassiopeiae system is a white subgiant (main sequence) star of spectral type A1Vm and 2.31 solar masses (M_{☉}) with a less massive main sequence dwarf star of type F2V and 1.35 M_{☉}.

In 1924, Joel Stebbins announced his discovery that the star, then known as 21 Cassiopeiae, is an eclipsing binary. It was given its variable star designation, YZ Cassiopeiae, in 1925. The apparent magnitude of the eclipsing binary varies from 5.65 to 6.05 with a period of 4.4672 days. Combined, they appear to have a spectral type of A2IV.

The binary has a dimmer (magnitude 9.7 according to Norton, or 10.5 by SIMBAD) companion of 0.8 M_{☉} orbiting with a period of about 86 580 years.
