= Rangifer (constellation) =

Former constellation

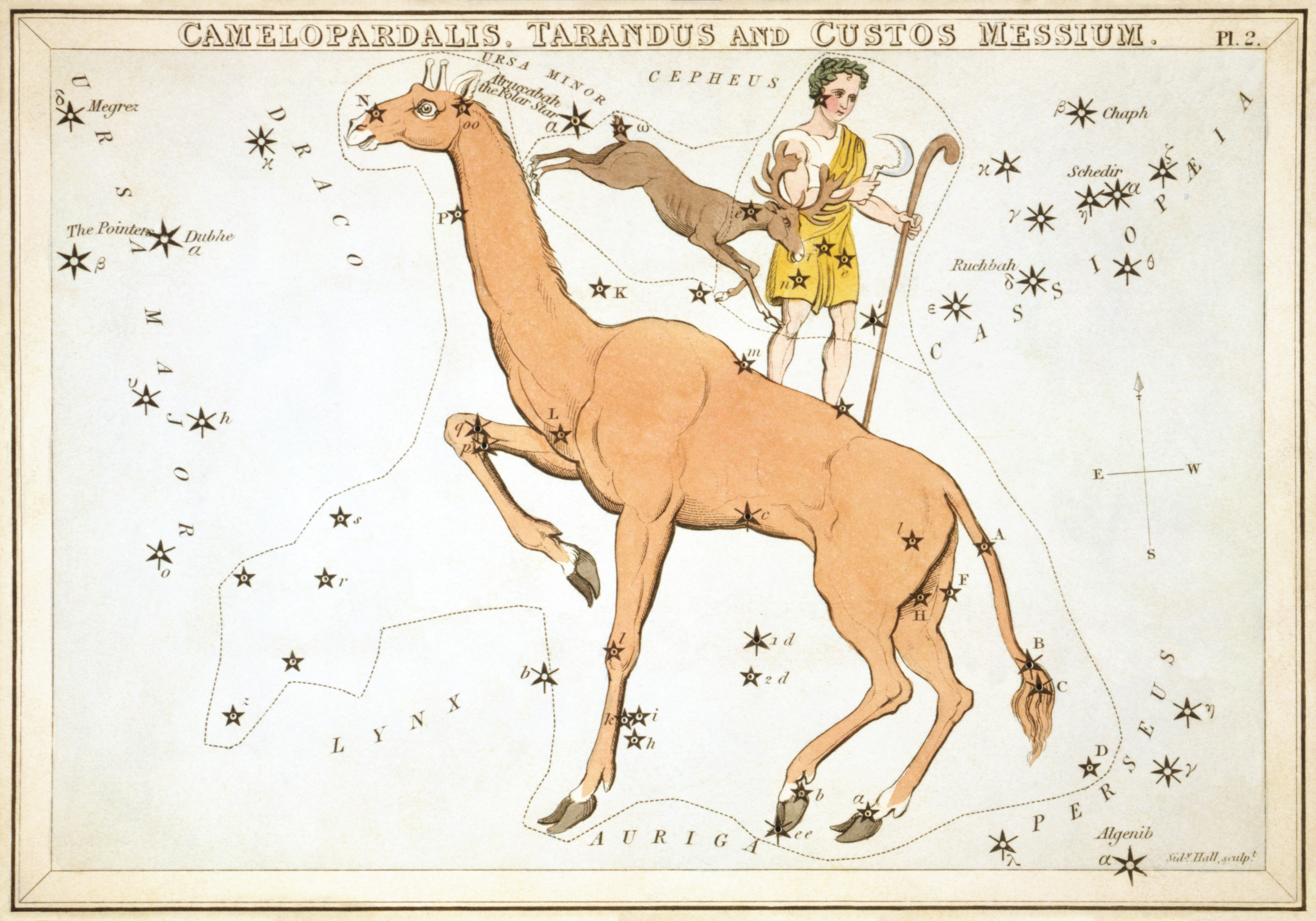
Tarandus and the likewise-obsolete constellation of Custos Messium depicted above Camelopardalis.

Rangifer was a small northern circumpolar constellation between the constellations of Cassiopeia and Camelopardalis. It was also known as Tarandus. Both words mean "reindeer" in Latin. "Rangifer" is the generic name of the reindeer, and "tarandus" is the specific name. The constellation may also be referred to as Renne.

The constellation was found in the northern sky near the now obsolete constellation of Custos Messium (the harvest keeper).

The constellation is no longer in use. In 2025, the IAU Working Group on Star Names adopted the names Rangifer and Tarandus for the stars 49 Cassiopeiae and 2 Ursae Minoris, respectively, after the obsolete constellation.

== History ==
The constellation Rangifer was created by the French astronomer Pierre Charles Le Monnier in 1736 to commemorate the expedition of Maupertuis to Lapland. Geodetical observations from the expedition proved Earth's oblateness.

There is also a Sámi reindeer constellation, Sarvvis or Sarva, which is much larger, incorporating Auriga, Perseus, Cassiopeia, and Cepheus; it is the source of the modern star names Sarvvis and Áldu for two stars in Perseus. Le Monnier's constellation may have been inspired by the Sámi constellation.

== See also ==
- Former constellations
