= 49 Cassiopeiae =

Binary star system in the constellation Cassiopeia

- Location of 49 Cassiopeiae (circled in red)

Observation data Epoch J2000.0 Equinox ICRS
- Constellation: Cassiopeia
- 49 Cas A
- Right ascension: 02^{h} 05^{m} 31.55013^{s}
- Declination: +76° 06′ 54.2164″
- Apparent magnitude (V): 5.32
- 49 Cas B
- Right ascension: 02^{h} 05^{m} 30.09074^{s}
- Declination: +76° 06′ 51.9730″
- Apparent magnitude (V): 12.30

Characteristics

49 Cas A
- Evolutionary stage: horizontal branch
- Spectral type: G8III
- B−V color index: 0.954±0.003

Astrometry

49 Cas A
Radial velocity (R_{v})	−0.20±0.30 km/s
Proper motion (μ)	RA: −11.813 mas/yr Dec.: −20.561 mas/yr
Parallax (π)	7.6673±0.0700 mas
Distance	425 ± 4 ly (130 ± 1 pc)
Absolute magnitude (M_{V})	−0.44

49 Cas B
Proper motion (μ)	RA: −13.572 mas/yr Dec.: −19.339 mas/yr
Parallax (π)	7.9161±0.0228 mas
Distance	412 ± 1 ly (126.3 ± 0.4 pc)

Details

49 Cas A
Mass	2.6 M_{☉}
Radius	16.6 R_{☉}
Luminosity	140 L_{☉}
Surface gravity (log g)	2.66 cgs
Temperature	5,087 K
Metallicity [Fe/H]	−0.04 dex
Rotational velocity (v sin i)	1.2 km/s
Age	647 Myr

49 Cas B
Mass	0.81 M_{☉}
Radius	0.76 R_{☉}
Luminosity	0.28 L_{☉}
Surface gravity (log g)	4.59 cgs
Temperature	4,886 K
Age	1.6 Gyr

Other designations
- Rangifer, 49 Cas, BD+75°86, GC 2475, HD 12339, HIP 9763, HR 592, SAO 4565, CCDM J02056+7607, GSC 04495-01881

Database references
SIMBAD	data

49 Cassiopeiae, also named Rangifer, is a binary star system in the northern circumpolar constellation of Cassiopeia. It is visible to the naked eye as a faint, yellow-hued point of light with an apparent visual magnitude of 5.22. The system is located about 412 light years away from the Sun, based on parallax. The pair had an angular separation of 5.40″ along a position angle of 244°, as of 2008, with the brighter component being of magnitude 5.32 and its faint companion having magnitude 12.30.

The primary, designated component A, is an aging giant star with a stellar classification of G8III. It is 302 million years old with 3.3 times the mass of the Sun. With the supply of hydrogen at its core exhausted, the star has now expanded to 17 times the Sun's radius. It is a red clump giant on the horizontal branch, which indicates it is generating energy through the fusion of helium at its core. The star is radiating 140 times the luminosity of the Sun from its swollen photosphere at an effective temperature of 5,087 K. Its faint secondary companion, component B, is of an unknown spectral type. It has a temperature similar to the primary, but a luminosity much lower than the Sun's.

This star was part of the now-obsolete constellation Rangifer, the reindeer, which was also called Tarandus. Both words mean reindeer in Latin, and they form the reindeer's scientific name, Rangifer tarandus. The IAU Working Group on Star Names approved the name Rangifer for 49 Cassiopeiae A on 25 December 2025, and it is now so entered in the IAU Catalog of Star Names. 2 Ursae Minoris was named Tarandus.
