= List of stars in Cassiopeia =

This is the list of notable stars in the constellation Cassiopeia, sorted by decreasing brightness.

Name	B	F	Var	HD	HIP	RA	Dec	vis. mag.	abs. mag.	Dist. (ly)	Sp. class	Notes
α Cas	α	18		3712	3179	00^{h} 40^{m} 30.39^{s}	+56° 32′ 14.7″	2.24	−1.99	228	K0II-IIIvar	Schedar
β Cas	β	11		432	746	00^{h} 09^{m} 10.09^{s}	+59° 09′ 00.8″	2.28	1.17	54	F2III-IV	Caph; δ Sct variable, V_{max} = 2.25^{m}, V_{min} = 2.29^{m}, P = 0.10 d
γ Cas	γ	27		5394	4427	00^{h} 56^{m} 42.50^{s}	+60° 43′ 00.3″	2.47	−4.22	613	B0.5IV-V:ervar	Tiansi, Tsih, Navi; prototype γ Cas variable, V_{max} = 1.6^{m}, V_{min} = 3.0^{m}
δ Cas	δ	37		8538	6686	01^{h} 25^{m} 48.60^{s}	+60° 14′ 07.5″	2.68	0.26	99	A5Vv SB	Ruchbah; Algol variable, V_{max} = 2.68^{m}, V_{min} = 2.76^{m}, P = 759 d
ε Cas	ε	45		11415	8886	01^{h} 54^{m} 23.68^{s}	+63° 40′ 12.5″	3.35	−2.31	442	B2pvar	Segin; variable star, ΔV = 0.002^{m}, P = 0.09 d
η Cas	η	24		4614	3821	00^{h} 49^{m} 05.10^{s}	+57° 48′ 59.6″	3.46	4.59	19	G0V SB	Achird, RS CVn variable
ζ Cas	ζ	17		3360	2920	00^{h} 36^{m} 58.27^{s}	+53° 53′ 49.0″	3.69	−2.62	597	B2IV	Fùlù (附路), suspected variable
50 Cas		50		12216	9598	02^{h} 03^{m} 26.19^{s}	+72° 25′ 16.5″	3.95	0.47	162	A2V	Gang, variable star, ΔV = 0.003^{m}, P = 0.80 d
κ Cas	κ	15		2905	2599	00^{h} 32^{m} 59.99^{s}	+62° 55′ 54.4″	4.17	−6.34	4127	B1Ia	Cexing, α Cyg variable, V_{max} = 4.12^{m}, V_{min} = 4.21^{m}, P = 2.65 d
θ Cas	θ	33		6961	5542	01^{h} 11^{m} 05.93^{s}	+55° 08′ 59.8″	4.34	1.22	137	A7Vvar	Marfak; suspected variable
ι Cas	ι			15089	11569	02^{h} 29^{m} 03.99^{s}	+67° 24′ 08.6″	4.46	1.27	141	A5p Sr	Huagai, α^{2} CVn variable, V_{max} = 4.45^{m}, V_{min} = 4.53^{m}, P = 1.74 d
ο Cas	ο	22		4180	3504	00^{h} 44^{m} 43.50^{s}	+48° 17′ 03.8″	4.48	−2.74	906	B5III	triple star, γ Cas variable, V_{max} = 4.31^{m}, V_{min} = 4.62^{m}
48 Cas	A	48		12111	9480	02^{h} 01^{m} 57.55^{s}	+70° 54′ 25.4″	4.49	1.72	117	A3IV	quadruple star
ρ Cas	ρ	7		224014	117863	23^{h} 54^{m} 23.04^{s}	+57° 29′ 57.8″	4.51	−9.5	8500	F8Ia0-M2I	yellow hypergiant; semiregular variable, V_{max} = 4.1^{m}, V_{min} = 6.2^{m}, P = 320 d
υ^{2} Cas	υ^{2}	28		5395	4422	00^{h} 56^{m} 40.01^{s}	+59° 10′ 52.2″	4.62	0.62	206	G8III-IV	Castula
χ Cas	χ	39		9408	7294	01^{h} 33^{m} 55.93^{s}	+59° 13′ 55.5″	4.68	0.70	204	K0III	
ψ Cas	ψ	36		8491	6692	01^{h} 25^{m} 55.90^{s}	+68° 07′ 47.8″	4.72	0.86	193	K0III	
λ Cas	λ	14		2772	2505	00^{h} 31^{m} 46.32^{s}	+54° 31′ 20.4″	4.74	−0.44	354	B8Vn	suspected variable
ξ Cas	ξ	19		3901	3300	00^{h} 42^{m} 03.88^{s}	+50° 30′ 45.1″	4.80	−2.86	1109	B2.5V	suspected variable
HR 244				5015	4151	00^{h} 53^{m} 04.28^{s}	+61° 07′ 24.8″	4.80	3.46	61	F8V	spectroscopic binary
R Cas			R	224490	118188	23^{h} 58^{m} 24.80^{s}	+51° 23′ 19.0″	4.80		410	M6.5-9e	Mira variable, V_{max} = 4.7^{m}, V_{min} = 13.5^{m}, P = 430 d
υ^{1} Cas	υ^{1}	26		5234	4292	00^{h} 55^{m} 00.19^{s}	+58° 58′ 22.1″	4.83	−0.65	406	K2III	
1 Cas		1		218376	114104	23^{h} 06^{m} 36.81^{s}	+59° 25′ 11.2″	4.84	−2.81	1105	B0.5IV	
HD 19275				19275	14862	03^{h} 11^{m} 56.24^{s}	+74° 23′ 37.9″	4.85	1.37	162	A2Vnn	Shangcheng
τ Cas	τ	5		223165	117301	23^{h} 47^{m} 03.39^{s}	+58° 39′ 06.7″	4.88	1.26	173	K1III	
σ Cas	σ	8		224572	118243	23^{h} 59^{m} 00.53^{s}	+55° 45′ 17.8″	4.88	−3.47	1523	B1V...	
AR Cas			AR	221253	115990	23^{h} 30^{m} 01.92^{s}	+58° 32′ 56.1″	4.89	−1.34	575	B3IV	septuple star; Algol variable, V_{max} = 4.82^{m}, V_{min} = 4.96^{m}, P = 6.07 d
ν Cas	ν	25		4636	3801	00^{h} 48^{m} 49.99^{s}	+50° 58′ 05.5″	4.90	−0.49	389	B9III	
π Cas	π	20		4058	3414	00^{h} 43^{m} 28.09^{s}	+47° 01′ 28.7″	4.95	1.31	174	A5V	rotating ellipsoidal variable
φ Cas	φ	34		7927	6242	01^{h} 20^{m} 04.92^{s}	+58° 13′ 53.8″	4.95	−4.32	2329	F0Ia	foreground star appearing among NGC 457; suspected variable
4 Cas		4		220652	115590	23^{h} 24^{m} 50.25^{s}	+62° 16′ 58.2″	4.96	−1.91	771	M1III	slow irregular variable, V_{max} = 4.95^{m}, V_{min} = 5.00^{m}
ω Cas	ω	46		11529	9009	01^{h} 56^{m} 00.00^{s}	+68° 41′ 07.0″	4.97	−1.69	701	B8III	suspected variable
HD 3240				3240	2854	00^{h} 36^{m} 08.29^{s}	+54° 10′ 06.4″	5.08	−0.87	505	B7III	
V509 Cas			V509	217476	113561	23^{h} 00^{m} 05.10^{s}	+56° 56′ 43.4″	5.10	−6.77	7723	F80	yellow hypergiant; semiregular variable, V_{max} = 4.75^{m}, V_{min} = 5.5^{m}
μ Cas	μ	30		6582	5336	01^{h} 08^{m} 12.92^{s}	+54° 55′ 27.2″	5.17	5.78	25	G5VIp/M5V	Marfak; suspected variable
HD 15920				15920	12273	02^{h} 38^{m} 02.09^{s}	+72° 49′ 05.6″	5.17	0.69	256	G8III	
42 Cas		42		10250	8016	01^{h} 42^{m} 55.73^{s}	+70° 37′ 21.2″	5.18	0.51	281	B9V	suspected Algol variable
49 Cas		49		12339	9763	02^{h} 05^{m} 31.58^{s}	+76° 06′ 54.4″	5.22	−0.36	426	G8III	Rangifer
47 Cas		47		12230	9727	02^{h} 05^{m} 07.05^{s}	+77° 16′ 53.2″	5.27	2.64	109	F0Vn	
40 Cas		40		9774	7650	01^{h} 38^{m} 30.94^{s}	+73° 02′ 24.3″	5.28	−0.40	447	G8II-III	suspected variable
HD 11946				11946	9312	01^{h} 59^{m} 37.99^{s}	+64° 37′ 17.9″	5.29	0.81	257	A0Vn	
31 Cas		31		6829	5518	01^{h} 10^{m} 39.27^{s}	+68° 46′ 43.3″	5.32	0.38	318	A0Vnn	
HD 4775				4775	3951	00^{h} 50^{m} 43.57^{s}	+64° 14′ 51.3″	5.35	−1.63	813	A4V comp SB	variable star, ΔV = 0.008^{m}, P = 0.96 d
12 Cas		12		2011	1960	00^{h} 24^{m} 47.49^{s}	+61° 49′ 51.8″	5.38	−1.47	763	B9III	
HD 4222				4222	3544	00^{h} 45^{m} 17.20^{s}	+55° 13′ 17.1″	5.41	0.25	351	A2Vs	
23 Cas		23		4382	3721	00^{h} 47^{m} 46.02^{s}	+74° 50′ 51.3″	5.42	−1.54	803	B8III	
6 Cas		6	V566	223385	117447	23^{h} 48^{m} 50.17^{s}	+62° 12′ 52.3″	5.43	−8.06	6150	A3Ia comp	α Cyg variable, V_{max} = 5.34^{m}, V_{min} = 5.45^{m}, P = 37.26 d
HD 3474				3574	3083	00^{h} 39^{m} 09.89^{s}	+49° 21′ 16.5″	5.45	−2.60	1331	K5III	
HD 9900				9900	7617	01^{h} 38^{m} 07.56^{s}	+57° 58′ 39.5″	5.55	−2.17	1140	G5II	
HD 223173				223173	117299	23^{h} 47^{m} 01.91^{s}	+57° 27′ 05.0″	5.55	−3.00	1672	K3II	slow irregular variable, V_{max} = 5.51^{m}, V_{min} = 5.54^{m}
HD 5408				5408	4440	00^{h} 56^{m} 46.94^{s}	+60° 21′ 46.3″	5.56	−0.81	614	B8V	
HD 6960				6960	5566	01^{h} 11^{m} 25.52^{s}	+64° 12′ 09.8″	5.56	0.06	410	B9.5V	suspected eclipsing binary
HD 220369				220369	115395	23^{h} 22^{m} 32.52^{s}	+60° 08′ 00.6″	5.56	−2.73	1482	K3II	suspected variable
10 Cas		10		144	531	00^{h} 06^{m} 26.53^{s}	+64° 11′ 46.2″	5.57	−1.82	982	B9III	suspected variable
32 Cas		32	RU	6972	5589	01^{h} 11^{m} 41.37^{s}	+65° 01′ 08.0″	5.57	0.34	363	B9IV	RU Cas, suspected constant
43 Cas		43	V557	10221	7965	01^{h} 42^{m} 20.44^{s}	+68° 02′ 35.0″	5.57	−0.10	444	A0p SiSr	α^{2} CVn variable, V_{max} = 5.55^{m}, V_{min} = 5.64^{m}, P = 3.18 d
HD 219134				219134	114622	23^{h} 13^{m} 14.74^{s}	+57° 10′ 03.5″	5.57	6.50	21	K3Vvar	suspected variable; has 5-6 planets
HR 9059			V1022	224355	118077	23^{h} 57^{m} 08.49^{s}	+55° 42′ 20.6″	5.57	1.45	218	G8Ib	Algol variable, V_{max} = 5.56^{m}, V_{min} = 5.68^{m}, P = 12.16 d
HD 224893				224893	124	00^{h} 01^{m} 37.02^{s}	+61° 13′ 22.1″	5.58	−4.75	3791	F0III	suspected variable
HD 1976			V746	1976	1921	00^{h} 24^{m} 15.64^{s}	+52° 01′ 11.7″	5.58	−2.54	1370	B5IV	spectroscopic binary; slowly pulsating B star
HD 219623				219623	114924	23^{h} 16^{m} 42.19^{s}	+53° 12′ 50.6″	5.58	4.04	66	F7V	
HD 2774				2774	2497	00^{h} 31^{m} 41.21^{s}	+52° 50′ 22.4″	5.59	0.18	393	K2III	
53 Cas		53		12301	9573	02^{h} 03^{m} 00.19^{s}	+64° 23′ 24.1″	5.59	−4.54	3468	B8Ib	
HD 17948				17948	13665	02^{h} 55^{m} 56.74^{s}	+61° 31′ 15.8″	5.59	3.48	86	F4V	
HR 511			V987	10780	8362	01^{h} 47^{m} 44.06^{s}	+63° 51′ 11.2″	5.63	5.64	33	K0V	BY Draconis variable, ΔV = 0.05^{m}, P = 21.7 d
YZ Cas		21	YZ	4161	3572	00^{h} 45^{m} 39.11^{s}	+74° 59′ 17.3″	5.64	0.89	290	A2IV	triple system; Algol variable
68 Cas		68		4142	3478	00^{h} 44^{m} 26.23^{s}	+47° 51′ 50.3″	5.66	−1.18	760	B5V...	
2 Cas		2		218753	114365	23^{h} 09^{m} 44.14^{s}	+59° 19′ 57.7″	5.68	−3.23	1976	A5III	suspected variable
HD 9352				9352	7251	01^{h} 33^{m} 25.71^{s}	+58° 19′ 38.4″	5.69	−3.20	1952	K0Ib+...	slow irregular variable, V_{max} = 5.68^{m}, V_{min} = 5.72^{m}
HD 2054				2054	1982	00^{h} 25^{m} 06.39^{s}	+53° 02′ 48.4″	5.72	−0.33	528	B9IV	suspected variable
HD 1239				1239	1354	00^{h} 16^{m} 57.05^{s}	+61° 31′ 59.5″	5.74	−0.73	642	G8III	
HD 6676				6676	5361	01^{h} 08^{m} 33.45^{s}	+58° 15′ 48.5″	5.77	−0.43	567	B8V	
HD 3283				3283	2876	00^{h} 36^{m} 27.34^{s}	+60° 19′ 34.4″	5.78	−4.29	3361	A4III	
44 Cas		44		10425	8046	01^{h} 43^{m} 19.74^{s}	+60° 33′ 04.9″	5.78	−1.46	913	B8IIIn	
HD 225289			V567	225289	418	00^{h} 05^{m} 06.13^{s}	+61° 18′ 50.3″	5.80	−0.93	724	B8MNp...	α^{2} CVn variable, V_{max} = 5.71^{m}, V_{min} = 5.81^{m}, P = 6.43 d
HD 16024				16024	12239	02^{h} 37^{m} 36.01^{s}	+65° 44′ 43.3″	5.80	−1.19	815	K5III	
38 Cas		38		9021	7078	01^{h} 31^{m} 13.52^{s}	+70° 15′ 53.2″	5.82	3.49	95	F6V	
HD 3856				3856	3299	00^{h} 42^{m} 03.44^{s}	+66° 08′ 51.4″	5.83	−0.11	503	G9III-IV	
HR 297				6210	5021	01^{h} 04^{m} 19.55^{s}	+61° 34′ 48.9″	5.83	1.31	261	F6V	
HD 1279				1279	1372	00^{h} 17^{m} 09.04^{s}	+47° 56′ 50.7″	5.86	−1.47	953	B7III	
HD 4440				4440	3750	00^{h} 48^{m} 08.88^{s}	+72° 40′ 28.0″	5.86	1.69	223	K0IV	
HD 225009				225009	207	00^{h} 02^{m} 36.08^{s}	+66° 05′ 56.3″	5.87	−3.15	2076	G8III	
V762 Cas			V762	7389	5926	01^{h} 16^{m} 11.90^{s}	+71° 44′ 37.8″	5.87	−7.42	2760	M3	BY Draconis variable
HD 19065				19065	14502	03^{h} 07^{m} 19.02^{s}	+64° 03′ 27.4″	5.89	−0.27	557	B9V	
9 Cas		9		225180	330	00^{h} 04^{m} 13.66^{s}	+62° 17′ 15.6″	5.90	−4.35	3663	A1III	suspected variable
HD 6130				6130	4962	01^{h} 03^{m} 37.01^{s}	+61° 04′ 29.4″	5.92	−2.41	1509	F0II	
HD 2952				2952	2611	00^{h} 33^{m} 10.32^{s}	+54° 53′ 42.3″	5.93	0.62	376	K0III	has a planet (b)
HD 2626				2626	2377	00^{h} 30^{m} 19.91^{s}	+59° 58′ 39.2″	5.94	−0.77	718	B9IIIn	
SU Cas			SU	17463	13367	02^{h} 51^{m} 58.75^{s}	+68° 53′ 18.7″	5.94	−2.24	1411	F5:Ib-II	classical Cepheid, V_{max} = 5.7^{m}, V_{min} = 6.18^{m}, P = 1.95 d
HD 16769				16769	12821	02^{h} 44^{m} 49.67^{s}	+67° 49′ 29.0″	5.95	0.47	406	A5III	variable star
HD 5550				5550	4572	00^{h} 58^{m} 31.00^{s}	+66° 21′ 06.6″	5.97	0.66	376	A0III	
HR 5			V640	123	518	00^{h} 06^{m} 15.54^{s}	+58° 26′ 12.1″	5.98	4.44	70	G5V	eclipsing binary, ΔV = 0.066^{m}, P = 1.03 d
HD 6211				6211	4998	01^{h} 04^{m} 02.39^{s}	+52° 30′ 08.3″	5.99	−1.42	991	K2	
52 Cas		52		12279	9564	02^{h} 02^{m} 52.49^{s}	+64° 54′ 05.4″	6.00	1.30	284	A1Vn	
HD 11857				11857	9220	01^{h} 58^{m} 33.22^{s}	+61° 41′ 52.1″	6.02	−0.70	721	B5III	suspected variable
V373 Cas			V373	224151	117957	23^{h} 55^{m} 33.84^{s}	+57° 24′ 43.8″	6.03			B0.5IIv SB	spectroscopic binary; eclipsing binary, V_{max} = 5.9^{m}, V_{min} = 6.3^{m}, P = 13.41 d
HD 4817				4817	3988	00^{h} 51^{m} 16.39^{s}	+61° 48′ 19.8″	6.04	−3.37	2489	K5Ib	variable star, ΔV = 0.009^{m}, P = 4.32 d
55 Cas		55		13474	10438	02^{h} 14^{m} 29.10^{s}	+66° 31′ 28.0″	6.05	−0.72	738	B9V+...	suspected variable
AO Cas			AO	1337	1415	00^{h} 17^{m} 43.07^{s}	+51° 25′ 59.1″	6.11	−5.11	5719	O9IIInn	Pearce's Star; rotating ellipsoidal variable, V_{max} = 6.07^{m}, V_{min} = 6.24^{m}, P = 3.52 d
HD 12173				12173	9586	02^{h} 03^{m} 10.51^{s}	+73° 51′ 02.0″	6.12	0.89	363	A5III	
HD 9030				9030	7050	01^{h} 30^{m} 52.01^{s}	+66° 05′ 53.2″	6.15	1.46	282	A2Vs	
HD 17958				17958	13700	02^{h} 56^{m} 24.66^{s}	+64° 19′ 56.8″	6.17	−1.80	1278	K3Ibvar	
HD 224784				224784	43	00^{h} 00^{m} 30.98^{s}	+59° 33′ 35.1″	6.18	0.59	427	G9III-IV	suspected variable
HD 2589				2589	2422	00^{h} 30^{m} 54.20^{s}	+77° 01′ 10.2″	6.18	3.20	128	K0IV	
13 Cas		13		2729	2474	00^{h} 31^{m} 25.20^{s}	+66° 31′ 10.7″	6.18	−0.53	716	B6V	variable star, ΔV = 0.007^{m}, P = 1.08 d
HD 3924				3924	3334	00^{h} 42^{m} 31.01^{s}	+58° 45′ 12.4″	6.18	−1.29	1016	B9.5III	
V773 Cas			V773	10543	8115	01^{h} 44^{m} 17.91^{s}	+57° 32′ 12.0″	6.18	1.69	258	A3V	Algol variable
HD 5343				5343	4383	00^{h} 56^{m} 12.93^{s}	+57° 59′ 47.7″	6.20	0.28	497	K3III	
HD 224870				224870	106	00^{h} 01^{m} 19.24^{s}	+49° 58′ 53.7″	6.22	−0.51	724	G7II-III	
HD 4881				4881	4023	00^{h} 51^{m} 33.79^{s}	+51° 34′ 17.2″	6.22	−1.51	1148	B9.5V	
HD 225094			V639	225094	274	00^{h} 03^{m} 25.72^{s}	+63° 38′ 25.9″	6.24	−3.92	3505	B3Ia	α Cyg variable, V_{max} = 6.19^{m}, V_{min} = 6.28^{m}, P = 2.88 d
HD 217673				217673	113684	23^{h} 01^{m} 30.72^{s}	+57° 06′ 19.7″	6.24	−1.56	1181	K2II	suspected variable
HD 222618				222618	116912	23^{h} 41^{m} 54.56^{s}	+57° 15′ 35.9″	6.24	−0.93	886	G8III	
HD 10587				10587	8148	01^{h} 44^{m} 46.15^{s}	+57° 05′ 21.2″	6.25	0.07	560	A2V	
HD 13222				13222	10350	02^{h} 13^{m} 21.05^{s}	+74° 01′ 40.1″	6.25	0.61	438	G8III	
HD 21970				21970	17056	03^{h} 39^{m} 25.10^{s}	+75° 44′ 22.6″	6.25	0.65	429	G9III-IV	
RZ Cas			RZ	17138	13133	02^{h} 48^{m} 55.51^{s}	+69° 38′ 03.1″	6.26	2.28	204	A3V	Algol variable, V_{max} = 6.18^{m}, V_{min} = 7.72^{m}, P = 1.20 d
HD 222570				222570	116876	23^{h} 41^{m} 26.80^{s}	+49° 30′ 44.9″	6.26	−0.63	778	A4V	
HD 5128				5128	4212	00^{h} 53^{m} 47.53^{s}	+52° 41′ 21.6″	6.27	1.61	278	A5m	
HD 5273				5273	4298	00^{h} 55^{m} 05.22^{s}	+48° 40′ 42.8″	6.28	−0.68	803	M2.5IIIa	variable star, ΔV = 0.012^{m}, P = 21.89 d
HD 6540				6540	5251	01^{h} 07^{m} 09.44^{s}	+53° 29′ 53.5″	6.31	−1.79	1358	K0	
HD 7732				7732	6261	01^{h} 20^{m} 19.45^{s}	+77° 34′ 13.7″	6.31	0.98	379	G5III...	
35 Cas		35		8003	6312	01^{h} 21^{m} 05.19^{s}	+64° 39′ 29.5″	6.33	2.01	238	A2Vnn	
HD 10362				10362	8020	01^{h} 42^{m} 58.32^{s}	+61° 25′ 15.9″	6.33	−1.15	1022	B7II	
HD 223386				223386	117450	23^{h} 48^{m} 53.91^{s}	+59° 58′ 44.2″	6.33	1.22	344	A0V	
HD 8424				8424	6685	01^{h} 25^{m} 46.30^{s}	+70° 58′ 47.7″	6.34	0.35	514	A0Vnn	
HD 10293				10293	7963	01^{h} 42^{m} 17.69^{s}	+58° 37′ 39.9″	6.35	−1.90	1455	B8III	suspected variable
HD 8272				8272	6486	01^{h} 23^{m} 21.27^{s}	+58° 08′ 35.6″	6.36	2.56	188	F4V	
HD 223421				223421	117472	23^{h} 49^{m} 11.89^{s}	+58° 57′ 47.6″	6.36	1.94	250	F2IV	
HD 7925				7925	6378	01^{h} 21^{m} 58.94^{s}	+76° 14′ 20.0″	6.37	1.95	250	F0IVn	
V805 Cas			V805	21179	16319	03^{h} 30^{m} 19.39^{s}	+71° 51′ 50.0″	6.37	−0.73	856	M2III	semiregular variable
HD 4818			V526	4818	3965	00^{h} 50^{m} 57.27^{s}	+51° 30′ 28.9″	6.38	2.26	217	F2IV	δ Sct variable, ΔV = 0.03^{m}
HD 4295				4295	3641	00^{h} 46^{m} 38.23^{s}	+69° 19′ 31.3″	6.39	3.35	132	F3V	
HD 5357				5357	4446	00^{h} 56^{m} 54.99^{s}	+68° 46′ 32.7″	6.39	2.51	195	F0m	
V465 Cas			V465	7733	6093	01^{h} 18^{m} 13.89^{s}	+57° 48′ 11.4″	6.39	−0.75	874	M5	semiregular variable, V_{max} = 6.1^{m}, V_{min} = 7.2^{m}, P = 60 d
HD 220074				220074	115218	23^{h} 20^{m} 14.37^{s}	+61° 58′ 12.5″	6.39	−0.91	942	K1V	suspected variable; has a planet
HD 5715				5715	4709	01^{h} 00^{m} 30.87^{s}	+70° 58′ 58.8″	6.40	1.21	355	A4IV	
V761 Cas			V761	7157	5688	01^{h} 13^{m} 09.82^{s}	+61° 42′ 22.3″	6.40	−0.11	652	B9V	α^{2} CVn variable
HD 222682				222682	116962	23^{h} 42^{m} 31.41^{s}	+61° 40′ 45.8″	6.40	0.66	459	K2III	
HD 371				371	695	00^{h} 08^{m} 32.87^{s}	+63° 12′ 14.6″	6.41	−1.91	1502	G3II	
HD 2904				2904	2628	00^{h} 33^{m} 19.20^{s}	+70° 58′ 54.7″	6.41	0.36	528	A0Vn	
HD 4362				4362	3649	00^{h} 46^{m} 42.47^{s}	+59° 34′ 28.3″	6.41			G0Ib	
HD 6497				6497	5240	01^{h} 07^{m} 00.07^{s}	+56° 56′ 06.9″	6.41	1.47	318	K2III...	
HD 218440				218440	114163	23^{h} 07^{m} 10.45^{s}	+59° 43′ 38.6″	6.41	−1.65	1336	B2.5IV	
HD 220130				220130	115245	23^{h} 20^{m} 34.54^{s}	+62° 12′ 47.8″	6.41	−2.24	1753	K2III	
HR 9017			V650	223358	117430	23^{h} 48^{m} 39.03^{s}	+64° 52′ 35.3″	6.41	−0.30	718	A0sp...	α^{2} CVn variable, ΔV = 0.02^{m}
HD 1142				1142	1269	00^{h} 15^{m} 54.87^{s}	+61° 00′ 00.7″	6.43	0.23	566	G8III...	
HD 217944				217944	113852	23^{h} 03^{m} 21.33^{s}	+58° 33′ 50.0″	6.43	1.71	286	G8IV	
HD 5459				5459	4475	00^{h} 57^{m} 19.53^{s}	+61° 25′ 19.0″	6.44	0.21	575	G8IV	
HD 222748				222748	116991	23^{h} 43^{m} 05.03^{s}	+51° 56′ 21.6″	6.44	0.27	559	K0	
HD 1601				1601	1639	00^{h} 20^{m} 30.92^{s}	+48° 58′ 07.1″	6.46	−0.86	950	G0	
HD 17581				17581	13347	02^{h} 51^{m} 45.92^{s}	+58° 18′ 51.5″	6.46	1.75	285	A1m	
HD 222932				222932	117133	23^{h} 44^{m} 48.37^{s}	+55° 47′ 58.9″	6.46	0.65	473	G4III:	
16 Cas		16		3038	2707	00^{h} 34^{m} 24.89^{s}	+66° 45′ 01.3″	6.47	0.28	565	B9III	
V801 Cas			V801	19243	14626	03^{h} 08^{m} 54.18^{s}	+62° 23′ 04.5″	6.47	−2.48	2012	B1V:e	Be star
HD 223552				223552	117551	23^{h} 50^{m} 22.12^{s}	+51° 37′ 18.1″	6.47	3.43	132	F3V	
HD 224404				224404	118116	23^{h} 57^{m} 33.52^{s}	+60° 01′ 25.0″	6.47	−1.26	1144	B9III-IV	
HD 5927				5927	4786	01^{h} 01^{m} 27.04^{s}	+49° 32′ 39.2″	6.48	−0.77	921	G5	
HD 6028				6028	4844	01^{h} 02^{m} 18.47^{s}	+51° 02′ 05.9″	6.48	0.04	632	A3V	
HD 9811				9811	7593	01^{h} 37^{m} 47.20^{s}	+64° 44′ 21.7″	6.49	−3.30	2964	A6Iab	
HR 8770			V638	217833	113797	23^{h} 02^{m} 43.80^{s}	+55° 14′ 11.0″	6.50		723	B9IIIwe...	α^{2} CVn variable
HD 19439				19439	14791	03^{h} 11^{m} 00.80^{s}	+64° 53′ 46.7″	6.50	2.03	256	A4V	
V649 Cas			V649	219634	114904	23^{h} 16^{m} 27.05^{s}	+61° 57′ 46.6″	6.53		3500	B0Vn	Algol variable, ΔV = 0.1^{m}, P = 2.39 d
54 Cas		54		12800	10031	02^{h} 09^{m} 07.69^{s}	+71° 33′ 09.3″	6.57	4.39	89	F8	
V816 Cas			V816	222670	116948	23^{h} 42^{m} 20.95^{s}	+64° 30′ 55.4″	6.58		942	M2III	slow irregular variable
V764 Cas			V764	7636	6027	01^{h} 17^{m} 26.69^{s}	+57° 37′ 55.5″	6.61		1900	B2IIIne	Be star
V784 Cas			V784	13122	10141	02^{h} 10^{m} 25.5^{s}	+59° 58′ 47.3″	6.64		335	F5II	δ Sct variable
V772 Cas			V772	10260	7939	01^{h} 42^{m} 02.91^{s}	+61° 02′ 17.7″	6.69		1220	B8IIIsp...	Algol variable
V809 Cas			V809	219978	115141	23^{h} 19^{m} 23.77^{s}	+62° 44′ 23.2″	6.74		1960	K4.5Ib	slow irregular variable
V779 Cas			V779	12013	9494	02^{h} 02^{m} 09.31^{s}	+75° 30′ 07.8″	6.78		626	A0	Algol variable
HD 11755				11755	9242	01^{h} 58^{m} 50.0^{s}	+73° 09′ 09″	6.87		755	G5	has a planet (b)
TU Cas			TU	2207	2085	00^{h} 26^{m} 19.45^{s}	+51° 16′ 49.3″	6.88			F3II...	double-mode Cepheid, V_{max} = 6.88^{m}, V_{min} = 8.18^{m}, P = 2.14 d
HD 18391				18391	13962	02^{h} 59^{m} 48.72^{s}	+57° 39′ 47.7″	6.89	−7.8	8000	G5Ia-Ib	Semiregular variable
HD 223960			V819	223960	117830	23^{h} 53^{m} 49.98^{s}	+60° 51′ 12.2″	6.90			A0.1Ia	α Cyg variable
V Cas			V	218997	114515	23^{h} 11^{m} 40.72^{s}	+59° 41′ 59.0″	6.90		1520	M5-7.5e	Mira variable, V_{max} = 6.9^{m}, V_{min} = 13.4^{m}, P = 229 d
V486 Cas			V486	3950	3346	00^{h} 42^{m} 37.99^{s}	+52° 20′ 13.7″	6.95			B1III	eclipsing binary, ΔV = 0.04^{m}, P = 5.56 d
HD 14817			V559	14817	11318	02^{h} 25^{m} 40.11^{s}	+61° 32′ 58.8″	7.02		695	B8V	Algol variable, V_{max} = 7.01^{m}, V_{min} = 7.23^{m}, P = 1.58 d
V777 Cas			V777	11606	8980	01^{h} 55^{m} 42.85^{s}	+59° 16′ 24.4″	7.02		959	B2Vne	Be star
HD 17505				17505	13296	02^{h} 51^{m} 07.98^{s}	+60° 25′ 03.9″	7.08		2860	O7V((f))+O9I	associated with a bow shock
CC Cas			CC	19820	15063	03^{h} 14^{m} 05.33^{s}	+59° 33′ 48.5″	7.08		1860	O8.5III	β Lyr variable, V_{max} = 7.06^{m}, V_{min} = 7.3^{m}, P = 3.37 d
HD 698			V742	698	940	00^{h} 11^{m} 37.15^{s}	+58° 12′ 42.6″	7.08		3500	B7:Ib-IIe	Be star
V989 Cas			V989	13579	10531	02^{h} 15^{m} 42.56^{s}	+67° 40′ 20.3″	7.13		60.6	K2V	BY Dra variable, ΔV = 0.03^{m}, P = 6.79 d
V636 Cas			V636	9250	7192	01^{h} 32^{m} 43.23^{s}	+63° 35′ 37.7″	7.19		1640	G0Ib	classical Cepheid, V_{max} = 7.09^{m}, V_{min} = 7.26^{m}, P = 8.38 d
HD 7924				7924	6379	01^{h} 21^{m} 59.12^{s}	+76° 42′ 37.0″	7.19	6.06	55	K0V	has three planets (b, c & d)
TV Cas			TV	1486	1550	00^{h} 19^{m} 18.74^{s}	+59° 08′ 20.6″	7.22		516	B9V	Algol variable, V_{max} = 7.22^{m}, V_{min} = 8.22^{m}, P = 1.81 d
V755 Cas			V755	3940	3367	00^{h} 42^{m} 50.06^{s}	+64° 17′ 28.6″	7.29		3700	A1Ia	α Cyg variable, V_{max} = 7.25^{m}, V_{min} = 7.31^{m}, P = 5.67 d
RV Cas			RV	5016		00^{h} 52^{m} 42.76^{s}	+47° 24′ 56.1″	7.3			M5-6.5Se	Mira variable, V_{max} = 7.3^{m}, V_{min} = 16.1^{m}, P = 332 d
HD 108				108	505	00^{h} 06^{m} 03.39^{s}	+63° 40′ 46.8″	7.40		3800	O4-8f?p	binary star; runaway star; variable spectrum
HD 221585				221585	116221	23^{h} 32^{m} 54.0^{s}	+63° 09′ 20″	7.47			G8IV	has a planet (b)
HD 13908				13908	10743	02^{h} 18^{m} 15.0^{s}	+65° 35′ 40″	7.51		232	F8V	has two planets (b & c)
Gliese 83.3			V598	12208	9481	02^{h} 01^{m} 59.06^{s}	+61° 54′ 18.2″	7.52		906	K5III	slow irregular variable, V_{max} = 7.38^{m}, V_{min} = 7.54^{m}
HD 221568			V436	221568	116210	23^{h} 32^{m} 47.65^{s}	+57° 54′ 20.1″	7.55		709	A0p	Osawa's Star; α^{2} CVn variable, V_{max} = 7.55^{m}, V_{min} = 7.62^{m}, P = 159 d
HD 19557			V623	19557	14827	03^{h} 11^{m} 25.33^{s}	+57° 54′ 11.2″	7.57		1590	C4,5J	slow irregular variable, V_{max} = 7.34^{m}, V_{min} = 7.96^{m}
V487 Cas			V487	6474	5239	01^{h} 06^{m} 59.74^{s}	+63° 46′ 23.4″	7.60			G4Ia	UU Her variable, V_{max} = 7.44^{m}, V_{min} = 7.74^{m}, P = 99.6 d
HD 16429			V482	16429	12495	02^{h} 40^{m} 44.94^{s}	+61° 16′ 56.1″	7.65			O9.5III+F4V	triple star; β Cep variable
WZ Cas			WZ	224855	99	00^{h} 01^{m} 15.85^{s}	+60° 21′ 19.0″	7.70		2860	C9,2JLi	semiregular variable, V_{max} = 6.8^{m}, V_{min} = 7.7^{m}, P = 186 d
HD 12288			V540	12288	9604	02^{h} 03^{m} 30.51^{s}	+69° 34′ 56.4″	7.74		1010	A2	α^{2} CVn variable, V_{max} = 7.73^{m}, V_{min} = 7.75^{m}, P = 34.9 d
W Cas			W	5235	4284	00^{h} 54^{m} 53.85^{s}	+58° 33′ 49.1″	7.80			C9,1e	Mira variable, V_{max} = 7.8^{m}, V_{min} = 12.5^{m}, P = 406 d
HD 15558				15558	11832	02^{h} 32^{m} 42.54^{s}	+61° 27′ 21.6″	7.87			O4.5III	in IC 1805; binary star; extremely luminous
S Cas			S	7769		01^{h} 19^{m} 41.99^{s}	+72° 36′ 40.8″	7.9			S3-5/4-8	Mira variable, V_{max} = 7.9^{m}, V_{min} = 16.1^{m}, P = 612 d
HD 220842				220842	115714	23^{h} 26^{m} 37.0^{s}	+56° 53′ 12″	7.99		204	F8	has a planet (b)
U Cas			U	4350		00^{h} 46^{m} 21.37^{s}	+48° 14′ 38.7″	8.0			S4.5-6/3-5e	Mira variable, V_{max} = 8^{m}, V_{min} = 15.7^{m}, P = 277 d
HD 15570				15570	11837	02^{h} 32^{m} 49.42^{s}	+61° 22′ 42.1″	8.11		2100	O4If+	in IC 1805
V745 Cas			V745	1810	1805	00^{h} 22^{m} 53.32^{s}	+62° 14′ 29.1″	8.11			B0V+B1.5III	β Lyr variable
HD 220147			V812	220147	115267	23^{h} 20^{m} 48.92^{s}	+62° 24′ 45.2″	8.12		1060	B9p	α^{2} CVn variable
HD 17156				17156	13192	02^{h} 49^{m} 44.49^{s}	+71° 45′ 11.6″	8.17	3.70	255	G0IV	Nushagak, has a confirmed transiting planet (b)
HD 240237				240237	114840	23^{h} 15^{m} 42.22^{s}	+58° 02′ 35.7″	8.17			K2	has a planet (b)
HD 17520				17520	13308	02^{h} 51^{m} 14.46^{s}	+60° 23′ 09.8″	8.24			O8V+O9:V	transitioned to a Be star in the 1980s
V641 Cas			V641			00^{h} 09^{m} 26.34^{s}	+63° 57′ 14.1″	8.30			M0	semiregular variable
V368 Cas			V368	19644	14936	03^{h} 12^{m} 35.54^{s}	+59° 55′ 10.9″	8.32			B8II-III	Algol variable
HD 240210				240210		23^{h} 10^{m} 29.23^{s}	+57° 01′ 46.0″	8.33	2.55	468	K3III	has a planet
V605 Cas			V605	14242	10904	02^{h} 20^{m} 22.47^{s}	+59° 40′ 16.9″	8.36		1570	M2Iab	slow irregular variable, V_{max} = 8.22^{m}, V_{min} = 8.48^{m}
TW Cas			TW	16907	12906	02^{h} 45^{m} 54.82^{s}	+65° 43′ 35.1″	8.38		849	A0V	Algol variable, V_{max} = 8.32^{m}, V_{min} = 8.98^{m}, P = 1.43 d
HD 15629				15629	11891	02^{h} 33^{m} 20.59^{s}	+61° 31′ 18.2″	8.42		1330	O4.5V	in IC 1805
HD 5797			V551	5797	4717	01^{h} 00^{m} 33.43^{s}	+60° 26′ 40.9″	8.47		1490	Am	α^{2} CVn variable, V_{max} = 8.43^{m}, V_{min} = 8.77^{m}, P = 69 d
Z Cas			Z	222914		23^{h} 44^{m} 31.59^{s}	+56° 34′ 52.7″	8.5			M7e	Mira variable, V_{max} = 8.5^{m}, V_{min} = 15.4^{m}, P = 496 d
HD 217850				217850	113789	23^{h} 02^{m} 37.0^{s}	+58° 52′ 34″	8.5		199	G8V	has a companion star (B)
DO Cas			DO	16506	12543	02^{h} 41^{m} 24.16^{s}	+60° 33′ 11.8″	8.54		533	A2II	β Lyr variable, V_{max} = 8.39^{m}, V_{min} = 9.01^{m}, P = 0.68 d
HD 12098			V988	12098		02^{h} 00^{m} 40.18^{s}	+58° 31′ 37.1″				F0	rapidly oscillating Ap star
RW Cas			RW		7548	01^{h} 37^{m} 14.02^{s}	+57° 45′ 33.2″	8.58			G2	classical Cepheid, V_{max} = 8.62^{m}, V_{min} = 9.67^{m}, P = 14.79 d
DL Cas			DL	236429	2347	00^{h} 29^{m} 58.59^{s}	+60° 12′ 43.1″	8.63		1480	G1Ib-II_Hdel-1	in NGC 129; classical Cepheid, V_{max} = 8.63^{m}, V_{min} = 9.26^{m}, P = 8.00 d
RX Cas			RX		14542	03^{h} 05^{m} 45.75^{s}	+67° 34′ 38.6″	8.64			K1III+A5eIII	β Lyr variable, V_{max} = 8.64^{m}, V_{min} = 9.49^{m}, P = 32.31 d
Y Cas			Y	225082		00^{h} 03^{m} 21.47^{s}	+55° 40′ 51.8″	8.70			M7.5e	Mira variable, V_{max} = 8.7^{m}, V_{min} = 15.3^{m}, P = 413 d
BD+60 2522						23^{h} 20^{m} 44.52^{s}	+61° 11′ 40.6″	8.7		300	O6.5III	source of nebula NGC 7635
T Cas			T	1845	1834	00^{h} 23^{m} 14.27^{s}	+55° 47′ 33.2″	8.87			M7-9e	Mira variable, V_{max} = 6.9^{m}, V_{min} = 13^{m}, P = 445 d
PZ Cas			PZ		117078	23^{h} 44^{m} 03.28^{s}	+61° 47′ 22.2″	8.90			M3Iab:	semiregular variable
BM Cas			BM		4279	00^{h} 54^{m} 45.95^{s}	+64° 05′ 06.2″	8.91		1850	F0Ia	β Lyr variable, V_{max} = 8.78^{m}, V_{min} = 9.31^{m}, P = 197 d
HD 219415				219415		23^{h} 14^{m} 54.0^{s}	+56° 43′ 49″	8.94			K0III	has a planet
SX Cas			SX	232121	871	00^{h} 10^{m} 42.08^{s}	+54° 53′ 29.4″	8.87		771	B5+K3III	Algol variable, V_{max} = 8.96^{m}, V_{min} = 9.83^{m}, P = 36.56 d
WW Cas			WW		7260	01^{h} 33^{m} 32.69^{s}	+57° 45′ 05.4″	9.10			C5,5	slow irregular variable, V_{max} = 9.1^{m}, V_{min} = 11.7^{m}
FM Cas			FM	236349	1162	00^{h} 14^{m} 28.24^{s}	+56° 15′ 10.6″	9.16			F7.5Ib	classical Cepheid, V_{max} = 8.82^{m}, V_{min} = 9.47^{m}, P = 5.81 d
TZ Cas			TZ		117763	23^{h} 52^{m} 56.24^{s}	+61° 00′ 08.4″	9.18			M3Iab	slow irregular variable, V_{max} = 8.86^{m}, V_{min} = 10.5^{m}
AZ Cas			AZ			01^{h} 42^{m} 16.51^{s}	+61° 25′ 16.3″	9.22			M0Ib:ep+B	Algol variable, V_{max} = 9.22^{m}, V_{min} = 9.52^{m}, P = 3402 d
TX Cas			TX			02^{h} 52^{m} 16.19^{s}	+62° 46′ 57.5″	9.33			B1V	β Lyr variable, V_{max} = 9.16^{m}, V_{min} = 9.8^{m}, P = 2.93 d
X Cas			X		9057	01^{h} 56^{m} 38.09^{s}	+59° 15′ 33.7″	9.45		942	C5,4e	Mira variable, V_{max} = 9.45^{m}, V_{min} = 13.2^{m}, P = 423 d
XX Cas			XX			01^{h} 29^{m} 34.61^{s}	+60° 58′ 04.7″	9.57			B4Vn	Algol variable
SZ Cas			SZ		11420	02^{h} 27^{m} 13.77^{s}	+59° 27′ 38.2″	9.60		1210	G5III	classical Cepheid, V_{max} = 9.6^{m}, V_{min} = 10.02^{m}, P = 13.63 d
SW Cas			SW		114160	23^{h} 07^{m} 10.08^{s}	+58° 33′ 15.1″	9.74		1520	K0	classical Cepheid, V_{max} = 9.32^{m}, V_{min} = 10.01^{m}, P = 5.44 d
UU Cas			UU		117576	23^{h} 50^{m} 39.52^{s}	+60° 54′ 39.1″	9.74			B1Iab:	β Lyr variable
DD Cas			DD		118122	23^{h} 57^{m} 34.96^{s}	+62° 43′ 05.7″	9.84			F7	classical Cepheid, V_{max} = 9.56^{m}, V_{min} = 10.18^{m}, P = 9.81 d
PV Cas			PV	240208		23^{h} 10^{m} 02.58^{s}	+59° 12′ 06.1″	9.86			B6V	Algol variable, V_{max} = 9.71^{m}, V_{min} = 10.36^{m}, P = 1.75 d
SY Cas			SY		1213	00^{h} 15^{m} 09.81^{s}	+58° 25′ 27.4″	9.92		1210	F5	classical Cepheid, V_{max} = 9.4^{m}, V_{min} = 10.24^{m}, P = 4.07 d
DN Cas			DN			02^{h} 23^{m} 11.53^{s}	+60° 49′ 50.1″	9.93			O8Vv	Algol variable, V_{max} = 9.81^{m}, V_{min} = 10.24^{m}, P = 2.31 d
RY Cas			RY		117690	23^{h} 52^{m} 07.03^{s}	+58° 44′ 30.2″	9.95			F9Ib	classical Cepheid, V_{max} = 9.38^{m}, V_{min} = 10.39^{m}, P = 12.14 d
XY Cas			XY	236542	3886	00^{h} 49^{m} 53.26^{s}	+60° 07′ 38.6″	9.97		1190	F6Iab-b:...	classical Cepheid, V_{max} = 9.61^{m}, V_{min} = 10.26^{m}, P = 4.50 d
OX Cas			OX		5391	01^{h} 09^{m} 00.10^{s}	+61° 28′ 14.8″	10.06		1230	B1V	Algol variable, V_{max} = 9.9^{m}, V_{min} = 10.35^{m}, P = 2.49 d
RS Cas			RS		116556	23^{h} 37^{m} 16.06^{s}	+62° 25′ 44.4″	10.06			F7-G1Ib	classical Cepheid, V_{max} = 9.53^{m}, V_{min} = 10.36^{m}, P = 6.39 d
QQ Cas			QQ			23^{h} 45^{m} 36.75^{s}	+59° 54′ 21.6″	10.20			B2	β Lyr variable
V381 Cas			V381			00^{h} 32^{m} 51.61^{s}	+49° 19′ 39.3″	10.22			B	Algol variable
QX Cas			QX			23^{h} 58^{m} 43.15^{s}	+61° 09′ 39.5″	10.25			B1V+B1V	Algol variable, V_{max} = 10.19^{m}, V_{min} = 10.7^{m}, P = 6.00 d
V547 Cas			V547		2552	00^{h} 32^{m} 29.43^{s}	+67° 14′ 08.4″	10.29		32.8	M2V+M3V	triple star; flare star
AQ Cas			AQ		6174	01^{h} 19^{m} 10.35^{s}	+62° 23′ 48.4″	10.31			B3	Algol variable, V_{max} = 10.06^{m}, V_{min} = 11^{m}, P = 11.72 d
AB Cas			AB		12235	02^{h} 37^{m} 31.51^{s}	+71° 18′ 16.3″	10.32		888	A3Vv+...	Algol and δ Sct variable, V_{max} = 10.1^{m}, V_{min} = 11.85^{m}, P = 1.37 d
V459 Cas			V459			01^{h} 11^{m} 29.92^{s}	+61° 08′ 48.0″	10.36			B9	Algol variable
BY Cas			BY		8312	01^{h} 47^{m} 11.92^{s}	+61° 25′ 21.0″	10.41			F5	classical Cepheid, V_{max} = 10.06^{m}, V_{min} = 10.58^{m}, P = 3.22 d
VX Cas			VX			00^{h} 31^{m} 30.68^{s}	+61° 58′ 51.0″	10.50			A0Vep	UX Ori star, V_{max} = 10.5^{m}, V_{min} = 13.3^{m}
WR 1			V863	4004	3415	00^{h} 43^{m} 28.40^{s}	+64° 45′ 35.4″	10.54			WN4-s	
MWC 419			V594		3401	00^{h} 43^{m} 18.26^{s}	+61° 54′ 40.1″	10.60		657	B8eq	Orion variable
CE Cas			CE			23^{h} 58^{m} 09.31^{s}	+61° 12′ 49.3″	10.63		10800	F9Ib+F8Ib	in NGC 7790; binary classical Cepheid, V_{max} = 10.63^{m}, V_{min} = 11.15^{m}, P = 5.14 d and V_{max} = 10.62^{m}, V_{min} = 11.30^{m}, P = 4.48 d
CD Cas			CD; V405		117154	23^{h} 45^{m} 02.63^{s}	+63° 00′ 13.9″	10.64		1230	F6-G5	classical Cepheid, V_{max} = 10.37^{m}, V_{min} = 11.15^{m}, P = 7.80 d
VW Cas			VW		5138	01^{h} 05^{m} 48.22^{s}	+61° 45′ 17.8″	10.67			K0	classical Cepheid, V_{max} = 10.36^{m}, V_{min} = 11.07^{m}, P = 5.99 d
WR 3				9974	7681	01^{h} 38^{m} 55.63^{s}	+58° 09′ 22.7″	10.69			WN3h-w	surrounded by a unique stellar-wind bubble
VV Cas			VV		8614	01^{h} 51^{m} 07.03^{s}	+59° 53′ 17.5″	10.73			F6	classical Cepheid, V_{max} = 10.26^{m}, V_{min} = 11.2^{m}, P = 6.21 d
DF Cas			DF		12817	02^{h} 44^{m} 43.31^{s}	+61° 27′ 52.9″	10.74			F8	classical Cepheid, V_{max} = 10.53^{m}, V_{min} = 11.13^{m}, P = 3.83 d
V364 Cas			V364			00^{h} 52^{m} 43.01^{s}	+50° 28′ 10.2″	10.75			A7	Algol variable, V_{max} = 10.53^{m}, V_{min} = 11.22^{m}, P = 1.54 d
WY Cas			WY			23^{h} 58^{m} 01.30^{s}	+56° 29′ 13.5″	10.76			S6-6.5/6-e	Mira variable
ZZ Cas			ZZ		2644	00^{h} 33^{m} 30.38^{s}	+62° 30′ 40.2″	10.79		1290	B3	β Lyr variable
CH Cas			CH		115390	23^{h} 22^{m} 28.44^{s}	+62° 45′ 25.7″	10.79			F3Ibp	classical Cepheid, V_{max} = 10.47^{m}, V_{min} = 11.56^{m}, P = 15.09 d
CF Cas			CF		118174	23^{h} 58^{m} 17.98^{s}	+61° 13′ 15.8″	10.80		10800	B3	in NGC 7790; classical Cepheid, V_{max} = 10.8^{m}, V_{min} = 11.47^{m}, P = 4.88 d
BP Cas			BP		5846	01^{h} 15^{m} 01.09^{s}	+65° 35′ 57.9″	10.80			F6	classical Cepheid, V_{max} = 10.55^{m}, V_{min} = 11.33^{m}, P = 6.27 d
LS I +61 303			V615		12469	02^{h} 40^{m} 31.67^{s}	+61° 13′ 45.6″	10.8			B0Ve	microquasar, V_{max} = 10.4^{m}, V_{min} = 11.1^{m}, P = 26.50 d
V523 Cas			V523			00^{h} 40^{m} 06.26^{s}	+50° 14′ 15.5″	10.87			K4V	W UMa variable, V_{max} = 10.62^{m}, V_{min} = 11.45^{m}, P = 0.23 d
WASP-93						00^{h} 37^{m} 50.0^{s}	+51° 17′ 20″	10.97		815	F4	has a transiting planet (b)
CW Cas			CW			00^{h} 45^{m} 52.69^{s}	+63° 05′ 08.4″	11.08		1340	G8V	W UMa variable, V_{max} = 11.02^{m}, V_{min} = 11.62^{m}, P = 0.32 d
2S 0114+650			V662		6081	01^{h} 18^{m} 02.70^{s}	+65° 17′ 29.9″	11.09			B1Iae	X-ray pulsar, V_{max} = 10.97^{m}, V_{min} = 11.09^{m}, P = 11.60 d
IR Cas			IR			23^{h} 06^{m} 52.37^{s}	+54° 04′ 52.2″	11.14			F4...	β Lyr variable
IT Cas			IT			23^{h} 42^{m} 01.40^{s}	+51° 44′ 36.8″	11.23			F6	Algol variable
WR 2				6327	5100	01^{h} 05^{m} 23.01^{s}	+60° 25′ 19.0″	11.33			WN2-w	The only WN2 star known, GRB candidate
CG Cas			CG			00^{h} 00^{m} 59.25^{s}	+60° 57′ 32.2″	11.28			F5	classical Cepheid, V_{max} = 10.89^{m}, V_{min} = 11.73^{m}, P = 4.35 d
RX J0146.9+6121			V831			01^{h} 47^{m} 00.21^{s}	+61° 31′ 23.7″	11.34			B1III-Ve	in NGC 663; X-ray pulsar, V_{max} = 11.3^{m}, V_{min} = 11.5^{m}
IV Cas			IV			23^{h} 49^{m} 31.53^{s}	+53° 08′ 04.8″	11.34			A2	Algol and δ Sct variable
IX Cas			IX		390	00^{h} 04^{m} 50.82^{s}	+50° 14′ 05.5″	11.36		637	F7	W Vir variable, V_{max} = 11.19^{m}, V_{min} = 11.77^{m}, P = 9.15 d
UZ Cas			UZ		5658	01^{h} 12^{m} 41.16^{s}	+61° 12′ 48.1″	11.45		1840	G2	classical Cepheid, V_{max} = 10.93^{m}, V_{min} = 11.73^{m}, P = 4.26 d
GP Cas			GP		12416	02^{h} 39^{m} 50.44^{s}	+59° 35′ 51.3″	11.50			M2Iab	slow irregular variable
MWC 1080			V628		114995	23^{h} 17^{m} 25.58^{s}	+60° 50′ 43.4″	11.58			B0eq	Orion variable, V_{max} = 10.88^{m}, V_{min} = 11.84^{m}
CY Cas			CY		115925	23^{h} 29^{m} 12.77^{s}	+63° 22′ 27.5″	11.67			G1-2Ib	classical Cepheid, V_{max} = 11.07^{m}, V_{min} = 12.21^{m}, P = 14.38 d
UV Cas			UV			23^{h} 02^{m} 14.66^{s}	+59° 36′ 36.7″	11.80			F0/5Ib	R CrB variable
BS Cas			BS			01^{h} 21^{m} 38.57^{s}	+59° 10′ 27.1″	11.84			A-F	W UMa variable, V_{max} = 11.50^{m}, V_{min} = 12.16^{m}, P = 0.44 d
Gliese 82			V596		9291	01^{h} 59^{m} 23.51^{s}	+58° 31′ 16.1″	12.04		39.9	M4Ve	flare star
V627 Cas			V627		113373	22^{h} 57^{m} 40.99^{s}	+58° 09′ 12.5″	12.4			M2eII-III	semiregular variable, V_{max} = 12.4^{m}, V_{min} = 13.24^{m}
TY Cas			TY			00^{h} 36^{m} 59.42^{s}	+63° 08′ 01.7″				M6	Mira variable
V592 Cas			V592			00^{h} 20^{m} 52.22^{s}	+55° 42′ 16.3″	12.79			OB	nova-like star, ΔV = 0.4^{m}, P = 0.12 d
HV Cas			HV			01^{h} 11^{m} 03.48^{s}	+53° 43′ 40.2″	12.9			Ce	Mira variable
BH Cas			BH			00^{h} 21^{m} 21.38^{s}	+59° 09′ 05.4″	13			B3	W UMa variable, V_{max} = 12.51^{m}, V_{min} = 13.10^{m}, P = 0.41 d
IRAS 23304+6147						23^{h} 32^{m} 44.79^{s}	+62° 03′ 49.1″	13.1			G2Ia	post-AGB star, ΔV = 0.20^{m}, P = 85 d
LkHα 198			V633			00^{h} 11^{m} 25.83^{s}	+58° 49′ 28.6″	13.79			B9e	Herbig Ae/Be star; Orion variable
V664 Cas			V664			03^{h} 03^{m} 47.01^{s}	+64° 54′ 35.7″	14.56				central star of HFG 1, re-radiating binary system
V425 Cas			V425			23^{h} 03^{m} 46.66^{s}	+53° 17′ 14.9″					VY Scl variable
V709 Cas			V709			00^{h} 28^{m} 48.84^{s}	+59° 17′ 22.0″					DQ Her variable
4U 0115+634			V635			01^{h} 18^{m} 31.90^{s}	+63° 44′ 24.0″	15.19			B0.2Ve	X-ray pulsar, V_{max} = 14.5^{m}, V_{min} = 16.3^{m}, P = 24.3 d
V376 Cas			V376			00^{h} 11^{m} 26.52^{s}	+58° 50′ 03.7″				A3/F2e	Orion variable
IGR J00234+6141			V1033			00^{h} 22^{m} 57.64^{s}	+61° 41′ 07.6″	16.1				DQ Her variable, V_{max} = 16.1^{m}, V_{min} = 16.9^{m}, P = 0.17 d
V705 Cas			V705			23^{h} 41^{m} 47.19^{s}	+57° 30′ 59.5″	16.4				nova, V_{max} = 5.7^{m}, V_{min} = 16.4^{m}
Tycho G						00^{h} 25^{m} 19.9^{s}	+64° 08′ 18″	17			G2IV	former companion of progenitor of SN 1572
V723 Cas			V723			01^{h} 05^{m} 05.36^{s}	+54° 00′ 40.3″	18.0			A7	nova, V_{max} = 7.08^{m}, V_{min} = <18.0^{m}
RNO 1B			V710			00^{h} 36^{m} 46.30^{s}	+63° 28′ 54.1″	18.6			F8II	FU Ori star, V_{max} = 18.6^{m}, V_{min} = 21.6^{m}
HT Cas			HT			01^{h} 10^{m} 13.13^{s}	+60° 04′ 35.4″	19.32			M5.5e	SU UMa variable and eclipsing binary, V_{max} = 12.6^{m}, V_{min} = 19.32^{m}
4U 0142+61						01^{h} 46^{m} 22.21^{s}	+61° 45′ 03.8″	25.62				magnetar
IGR J00291+5934			V1037			00^{h} 29^{m} 13.06^{s}	+59° 34′ 19.0″					X-ray pulsar with millisecond pulsar
1E 2259+586						23^{h} 01^{m} 08.14^{s}	+58° 52′ 44.5″					magnetar
PSR B2319+60						23^{h} 21^{m} 55.21^{s}	+60° 24′ 30.7″					pulsar
PSR B2334+61						23^{h} 37^{m} 05.78^{s}	+61° 51′ 01.7″					pulsar
PSR J0205+6449						02^{h} 05^{m} 37.92^{s}	+64° 49′ 42.8″					central pulsar of 3C 58
OH 127.8+0.0			V669			01^{h} 33^{m} 51.21^{s}	+62° 26′ 53.2″				M9III	Mira variable
W3 IRS 5						02^{h} 25^{m} 40.54^{s}	+62° 05′ 51.4″				B1	protostar; possibly similar to a proto-Trapezium
IRAS 00338+6312						00^{h} 36^{m} 47.5^{s}	+63° 29′ 02″					protostar
Table legend: Name = Proper name; B = Bayer designation; F or/and G. = Flamsteed designation or Gould designation; Var = Variable-star designation; HD = Henry Draper Catalogue designation number; HIP = Hipparcos Catalogue designation number; RA = Right ascension for the Epoch/Equinox J2000.0; Dec = Declination for the Epoch/Equinox J2000.0; vis. mag. = visual magnitude (m or m_{v}), also known as apparent magnitude; abs. mag. = absolute magnitude (M_{v}); Dist. (ly) = Distance in light-years from Earth; Sp. class = Spectral class of the star in the stellar classification system; Notes = Common name(s) or alternate name(s); comments; notable properties [for example: multiple star status, range of variability if it is a variable star, exoplanets, etc.]
