= HR 7955 =

Star in the constellation Cepheus

- Location of HR 7955 (circled in red)

Observation data Epoch J2000 Equinox ICRS
- Constellation: Cepheus
- Right ascension: 20^{h} 45^{m} 21.12879^{s}
- Declination: +57° 34′ 47.0080″
- Apparent magnitude (V): 4.51

Characteristics
- Spectral type: F8IV-V + F9IV-V

Astrometry
Radial velocity (R_{v})	−32.82±0.04 km/s
Proper motion (μ)	RA: −62.32 mas/yr Dec.: −236.00 mas/yr
Parallax (π)	36.64±0.48 mas
Distance	89 ± 1 ly (27.3 ± 0.4 pc)
Absolute magnitude (M_{V})	2.35

Orbit
Period (P)	494.16±0.58 d
Semi-major axis (a)	0.065±0.001" (≥50.2±0.5 Gm)
Eccentricity (e)	0.551±0.004
Inclination (i)	24.53±3.13°
Longitude of the node (Ω)	325.21±1.05°
Periastron epoch (T)	B 1996.335 ± 0.0017
Argument of periastron (ω) (secondary)	68.86±0.76°

Details

HR 7955 A
Mass	1.071±0.037 M_{☉}
Age	2.25 Gyr

HR 7955 B
Mass	1.047±0.037 M_{☉}

Other designations
- BD+57°2240, FK5 782, GJ 9706, HD 198084, HIP 102431, HR 7955, SAO 32862

Database references
SIMBAD	data

HR 7955 is a binary star system in the northern circumpolar constellation of Cepheus, near the constellation border with Cygnus. It has a yellow-white hue and is faintly visible to the naked eye with a combined apparent visual magnitude of 4.51. The system is located at a distance of 89 light-years (27.3 parsecs) from the Sun, based on parallax. It has a relatively high proper motion, traversing the celestial sphere at the rate of 0.243 arc seconds per annum, and is drifting closer to the Sun with a radial velocity of -33 km/s.

The double-lined nature of this spectroscopic binary system was not announced until 1972. It has an orbital period of 1.35 years and an eccentricity of 0.551. Both components appear to be slightly evolved stars that are leaving the main sequence and becoming subgiant stars, with stellar classifications of F8IV-V and F9IV-V. They each have slightly greater mass than the Sun: 107% and 105%, respectively. The system is about 2.25 billion years old.

This star is occasionally known as Upsilon Cephei (υ Cephei). According to the Bright Star Catalogue, this Bayer designation appeared in Elijah H. Burritt's star atlas but is not confirmed elsewhere. Nevertheless, it is listed in the SIMBAD database. R. H. Allen's Star Names erroneously states that "υ^{1} and υ^{2}" Cephei were given the name Castula by Bayer; this was actually the name of υ^{1} and υ^{2} Cassiopeiae, now officially applied to the latter.
