= Upsilon Cassiopeiae =

The Bayer designation Upsilon Cassiopeiae (υ Cas / υ Cassiopeiae) is shared by two star systems, in the constellation Cassiopeia:

- υ¹ Cassiopeiae
- υ² Cassiopeiae

They are separated by 0.3° on the sky.
