= HD 5550 =

HD 5550 may refer to:

- The graphics card in the Radeon HD 5000 series
- HR 273, a class A0 giant star in Cassiopeia
