= 1E 2259+586 =

X-ray pulsar and neutron star in Cassiopeia

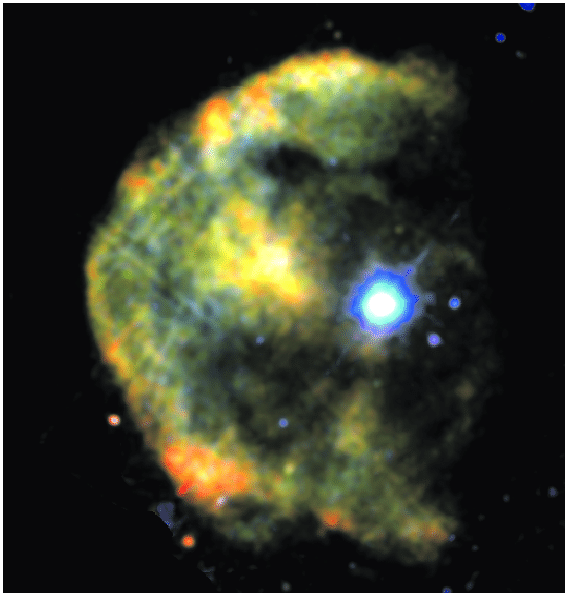
- Image of supernova remnant CTB 109 and the central star 1E 2259+58.6

Observation data Epoch J2000.0 Equinox ICRS
- Constellation: Cassiopeia
- Right ascension: 23^{h} 01^{m} 08.14^{s}
- Declination: +58° 52′ 44.5″

Characteristics
- Evolutionary stage: Neutron star

Astrometry
Distance	10,000 light-years (3.1 kpc) ly

Details
Rotation	6.98 s
Age	15,000–100,000 years

Other designations
- 2E 4673, 1E 2259+58.6, INTREF 1098, PSR J2301+5852, PSR B2259+58.6, 1RXS J230109.7+585242, SRGA J230109.9+585254, 2XMM J230108.1+585244

Database references
SIMBAD	data

1E 2259+58.6 is an anomalous X-ray pulsar (AXP) and magnetar located approximately 10,000 light-years (3.1 kpc) away from the Sun in the constellation of Cassiopeia. It is one of the first discovered AXP's that helped in unifying anomalous X-ray pulsars with soft gamma repeaters (SGRs) under the magnetar model. The source is located near the center of the supernova remnant CTB 109.

== Discovery ==
The source was discovered in 1981 as an X-ray source by G. G. Fahiman, P. C. Gregory, P. Hickson and H. B. Richer using the Einstein Observatory.

== Characteristics ==
1E 2259+586 has abrupt slowdowns in rotation, which is called an anti-glitch, in contrast to the more common glitches seen in pulsars. Its activity is not only affected by its magnetic field's intensity, but also by the field's topology inside the star. Its period is 6.98 s, and it is likely around 15,000 years old. The observed luminosity is about 10^{28} W in X-rays, and around 10 times that in the 100–1000 MeV gamma-ray band. Positrons are created in the magnetosphere of this magnetar in the process of interaction between photons and ultrarelativistic electrons.
