= HD 18391 =

Star in the constellation Cassiopeia

Observation data Epoch J2000 Equinox J2000
- Constellation: Cassiopeia
- Right ascension: 02^{h} 59^{m} 48.72255^{s}
- Declination: +57° 39′ 47.6735″
- Apparent magnitude (V): +6.89 – +6.98

Characteristics
- Evolutionary stage: yellow supergiant
- Spectral type: G5Ia-Ib
- Variable type: SRd

Astrometry
Radial velocity (R_{v})	−38.47±0.68 km/s
Proper motion (μ)	RA: +0.227 mas/yr Dec.: −1.376 mas/yr
Parallax (π)	0.4084±0.0219 mas
Distance	8,000 ± 400 ly (2,400 ± 100 pc)
Absolute magnitude (M_{V})	−7.8

Details
Mass	19 M_{☉}
Radius	329 R_{☉}
Luminosity	104,000 L_{☉}
Surface gravity (log g)	1.2 cgs
Temperature	5,775 K
Metallicity [Fe/H]	+0.02 dex
Age	9±1 Myr

Other designations
- NSV 15616, BD+57°672, HD 18391, HIP 13962

Database references
SIMBAD	data

HD 18391 is a yellow supergiant star in the northern constellation Cassiopeia. Its brightness varies between apparent magnitudes 6.89 and 6.98 which makes it hard to be seen by the naked eye even from dark skies.

Parallax measurements by the Gaia spacecraft suggest a distance of around 8,000 light years, although an earlier analysis of nearby luminous main sequence stars forming a loose open cluster suggest a distance closer to 5,400 light years if HD 18391 is a member.

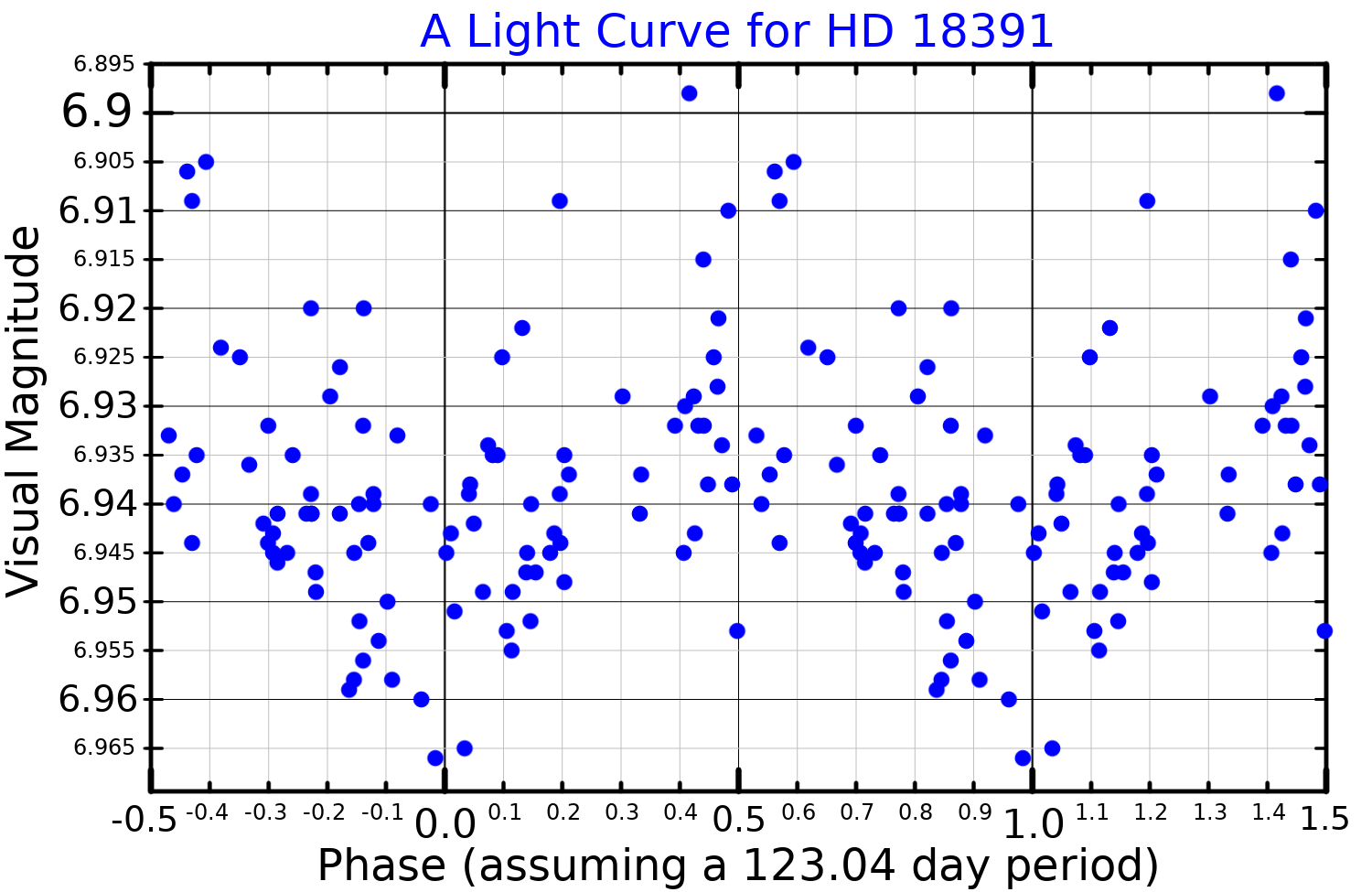
A visual band light curve for HD 18391, plotted from data published by Turner et al. (2009)

HD 18391 lies close to the instability strip, an area of the H-R Diagram where variable stars pulsate in a regular manner with periods related to their luminosity. It is slightly hotter and more luminous than classical Cepheid variable stars on the strip and its pulsations are somewhat less regular. The main pulsation period is 123 days, but with a secondary period of 178 days. The amplitude of the light variations is smaller than most Cepheid variables at less than 0.1 magnitudes. If the secondary period represents the fundamental mode, then it corresponds closely to the period expected for a Cepheid variable of similar luminosity.
