= ADS 1359 =

Multiple star system in the constellation Cassiopeia

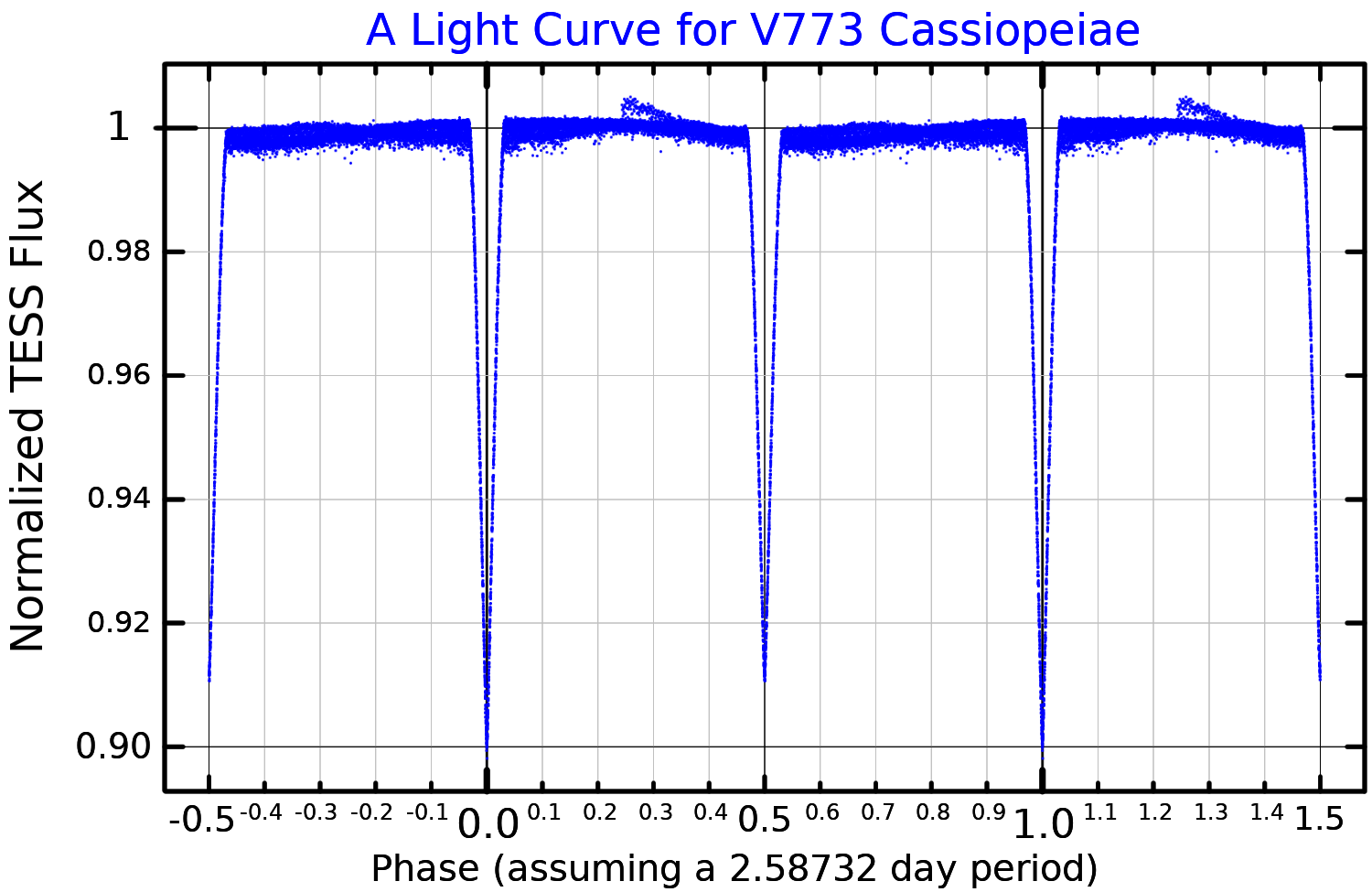
- A light curve for V773 Cassiopeiae (ADS 1359) plotted from TESS data

Observation data Epoch J2000 Equinox ICRS
- Constellation: Cassiopeia
- Right ascension: 01^{h} 44^{m} 17.968^{s}
- Declination: +57° 32′ 11.77″
- Apparent magnitude (V): 6.18 (6.28±0.01 + 8.61±0.02)

Characteristics
- Spectral type: G1-2V/G1-2V/A3/G5
- U−B color index: 0.05
- B−V color index: 0.13
- Variable type: Algol

Astrometry
Radial velocity (R_{v})	7.11±0.30 km/s
Proper motion (μ)	RA: +44.450 mas/yr Dec.: −11.315 mas/yr
Parallax (π)	14.4416±0.2292 mas
Distance	226 ± 4 ly (69 ± 1 pc)
Absolute magnitude (M_{V})	+1.54

Orbit
Primary	ADS 1359 A
Name	ADS 1359 B
Period (P)	184.9±2.7 yr
Semi-major axis (a)	0.911±0.065″
Eccentricity (e)	0.794±0.050
Inclination (i)	133.3±2.6°
Longitude of the node (Ω)	125.4±4.3°
Periastron epoch (T)	2021.8±2.1
Argument of periastron (ω) (secondary)	269.5±8.5°

Orbit
Primary	ADS 1359 Ba
Name	ADS 1359 Bb
Period (P)	2.587332±0.000002 d
Semi-major axis (a)	9.96±0.06 R⊙
Inclination (i)	84.7±2.2°
Semi-amplitude (K_{1}) (primary)	97.1±0.9 km/s
Semi-amplitude (K_{2}) (secondary)	97.0±1.6 km/s

Details

ADS 1359 A
Temperature	8522±38 K
Rotational velocity (v sin i)	84.55±1.42 km/s

ADS 1359 Ba
Mass	0.99±0.03 M_{☉}
Radius	1.05±0.05 R_{☉}
Temperature	5933±131 K
Rotational velocity (v sin i)	32.17±2.32 km/s

ADS 1359 Bb
Mass	0.99±0.04 M_{☉}
Radius	1.05±0.05 R_{☉}
Temperature	5693±161 K
Rotational velocity (v sin i)	49.10±7.46 km/s

Other designations
- BU 870, V773 Cassiopeiae, BD+56°330, HD 10543, HIP 8115, HR 499, WDS J01443+5732

Database references
SIMBAD	data
- A
- B

ADS 1359 is a quadruple star system in the constellation Cassiopeia. It is composed of two sun like stars in an eclipsing binary with a 2.5-day period, which is in turn orbited by an A-type main-sequence star with a 185-year orbital period. There is also HD 236848 which is a distant proper motion companion. It is very faintly visible to the naked eye under ideal observing conditions.

== Visual binary ==
The visual binary was discovered by Sherburne Wesley Burnham at Dearborn Observatory in Chicago in 1880. A first preliminary orbit was calculated in 1971 by astronomer Georgije Popović using observations from 1880 to 1967. Improved orbits were calculated in 1995, 2009 and 2017. The two stars were separated by 1.0″ when they were discovered, but only 0.50″ in 2010. The orbit has a high eccentricity and the separation of the two stars varies between about 0.2″ and 1.6″.

== Eclipsing binary ==
ADS 1359 was discovered by the Hipparcos spacecraft to be a detached eclipsing binary and given the variable star designation V773 Cassiopeiae. The derived period of variability was 1.29 days, exactly half the orbital period of the inner pair since each orbit produces two almost-identical eclipses. The eclipsing stars are the inner pair of the system. The two stars combined are still about eight times fainter than the third star and so the eclipses decrease the overall brightness of V773 Cas by less than 0.1 magnitudes.

== HD 236848 ==
The Washington Double Star Catalog lists a 16th magnitude companion as component C and a 10th magnitude companion as component D. Component D is HD 236848 and it shares the same space motion and distance as the inner three stars.
