= HR 297 =

Solitary star in the constellation Cassiopeia

Observation data Epoch J2000 Equinox ICRS
- Constellation: Cassiopeia
- Right ascension: 01^{h} 04^{m} 19.451^{s}
- Declination: +61° 34′ 48.66″
- Apparent magnitude (V): 5.84

Characteristics
- Evolutionary stage: Main sequence
- Spectral type: F6V
- U−B color index: +0.11
- B−V color index: +0.56

Astrometry
Radial velocity (R_{v})	−20.40 km/s
Proper motion (μ)	RA: −79.837 mas/yr Dec.: −24.915 mas/yr
Parallax (π)	12.7218±0.0301 mas
Distance	256.4 ± 0.6 ly (78.6 ± 0.2 pc)
Absolute magnitude (M_{V})	1.30

Details
Mass	1.953 M_{☉}
Radius	4.52±0.15 R_{☉}
Luminosity	25.16±1.59 L_{☉}
Surface gravity (log g)	3.86 cgs
Temperature	6,089±35 K
Metallicity [Fe/H]	−0.01 dex
Rotational velocity (v sin i)	42.0 km/s
Age	1.3 Gyr

Other designations
- BD+60°158, HD 6210, HIP 5021, SAO 11557

Database references
SIMBAD	data

HR 297 is a solitary star in the northern circumpolar constellation of Cassiopeia. It has an apparent visual magnitude of 5.8, making it faintly visible to the naked eye from dark suburban skies. Parallax measurements put this system at a distance of roughly 256 light years. It is drifting closer with a heliocentric radial velocity of −20.4 km/s.

This is an F-type main sequence star with a stellar classification of F7V. Because of the stability of this star, it is used as a standard in the photometric WBVR system. The angular diameter of this star has been measured directly using the CHARA Array, yielding an estimate of 4.5 times the diameter of the Sun. Stellar models suggest a mass equal to about twice that of the Sun, with 25 times the Sun's luminosity.

This is a young star with an estimated age of 1.3 billion years. It is rotating rapidly, with a projected rotational velocity of 42 km/s. The abundance of elements other than hydrogen and helium is about the same as that in the Sun. The effective temperature of the stellar atmosphere is 6,089 K, giving it the yellow-white hued glow of an F-type star.

This star has been examined for the presence of an infrared excess, but no statistically significant amount was detected. The detection of such an excess can indicate the presence of a dusty circumstellar disk.
