= HD 240237 =

Star in the constellation Cassiopeia

Observation data Epoch J2000 Equinox ICRS
- Constellation: Cassiopeia
- Right ascension: 23^{h} 15^{m} 42.22430^{s}
- Declination: +58° 02′ 35.6728″
- Apparent magnitude (V): 8.19

Characteristics
- Spectral type: K2III
- B−V color index: 1.682±0.029

Astrometry
Radial velocity (R_{v})	−24.46±0.12 km/s
Proper motion (μ)	RA: −0.146 mas/yr Dec.: −4.446 mas/yr
Parallax (π)	1.0841±0.0150 mas
Distance	3,010 ± 40 ly (920 ± 10 pc)
Absolute magnitude (M_{V})	−2.5

Details
Mass	1.69±0.42 or 0.61 M_{☉}
Radius	95 R_{☉}
Luminosity	2,745 L_{☉}
Temperature	4,361 K
Metallicity [Fe/H]	−0.26±0.07 dex
Rotation	≥ 1010 d
Age	270 Myr

Other designations
- BD+57°2714, HD 240237, HIP 114840, SAO 35269, 2MASS J23154222+5802358

Database references
SIMBAD	data

HD 240237 is a star in the northern constellation of Cassiopeia. It is an orange star that can be viewed with binoculars or a small telescope, but is too faint to be seen with the naked eye at an apparent visual magnitude of 8.19. This object is located at a distance of approximately 3,000 light years away from the Sun based on parallax, but is drifting closer with a radial velocity of −24 km/s.

This is an aging giant star with a stellar classification of K2III; a star that has exhausted the supply of hydrogen at its core and expanded to 95 times the radius of the Sun. S. Gettel and associates (2011) estimate the star is around 270 million years old with 1.7 times the mass of the Sun. However, S. G. Sousa and associates found a much lower mass of 0.61 times the mass of the Sun. It is radiating 1,244 times the Sun's luminosity from its enlarged photosphere at an effective temperature of 4,361 K.

== Planetary system ==
In 2011, Gettel et al. announced the discovery of a planet orbiting this star. They estimated a mass around 5 times that of Jupiter, with an orbital period of 2.042 years and a moderate eccentricity. Sousa et al. (2015) gave a much lower estimate of 1.53 M_{J}. The designation b for this object, derives from the order of discovery. The designation of b is given to the first planet orbiting a given star, followed by the other lowercase letters of the alphabet. In the case of HD 240237, there was only one planet, so only the letter b is used.

The HD 240237 planetary system
Companion (in order from star)	Mass	Semimajor axis (AU)	Orbital period (days)	Eccentricity	Inclination (°)	Radius
b	5.3 M_{J}	1.9	745.7±13.8	0.4±0.1	—	—
