= HD 4222 =

Binary star; Cassiopeia

- Location of HD 4222 on the map (circled)

Observation data Epoch J2000.0 Equinox J2000.0 (ICRS)
Constellation	Cassiopeia
- A
Right ascension	00^{h} 45^{m} 17.17365^{s}
Declination	+55° 13′ 17.0310″
- Apparent magnitude (V): 5.41±0.01
- B
Right ascension	00^{h} 45^{m} 17.14092^{s}
Declination	+55° 13′ 15.4000″
- Apparent magnitude (V): 11.5

Characteristics

A
- Evolutionary stage: main sequence star
- Spectral type: A2 Vs or A1 V
- U−B color index: +0.05
- B−V color index: +0.04

B
- Spectral type: M2-5V

Astrometry
Radial velocity (R_{v})	−8.5±2 km/s
Absolute magnitude (M_{V})	+0.44

A
Proper motion (μ)	RA: −29.935 mas/yr Dec.: −5.616 mas/yr
Parallax (π)	9.2342±0.0586 mas
Distance	353 ± 2 ly (108.3 ± 0.7 pc)

Details

A
Mass	2.59±0.04 M_{☉}
Radius	3.47±0.18 R_{☉}
Luminosity	69.1^{+5.6}_{−5.2} L_{☉}
Surface gravity (log g)	3.72^{+0.08}_{−0.06} cgs
Temperature	9,886 K
Metallicity [Fe/H]	−0.26 dex
Rotational velocity (v sin i)	25±8 km/s
Age	407^{+51}_{−52} Myr

Other designations
- AG+54°69, BD+54°143, GC 894, HD 4222, HIP 3544, HR 196, SAO 21677, ADS 625 A, CCDM J00453+5514A, WDS J00453+5513A, TIC 445136120

Database references
SIMBAD	data

HD 4222, also known as HR 196, is the primary of a binary star located in the northern constellation Cassiopeia. It is faintly visible to the naked eye as a white-hued point of light with an apparent magnitude of 5.41. Gaia DR3 parallax measurements imply a distance of 353 light-years and it is drifting closer with a heliocentric radial velocity of −8.5 km/s. At its current distance, HD 4222's brightness is diminished by an interstellar extinction of 0.13 magnitudes and it has an absolute magnitude of +0.44.

HD 4222 has a stellar classification of A2 Vs or A1 V, both classes indicating that it is an A-type main-sequence star that is generating energy via hydrogen fusion at its core. The former class includes the presence of 'sharp' or narrow absorption lines due to slow rotation. Consistent with the class, HD 4222 spins modestly with a projected rotational velocity of approximately 25 km/s. It has 2.59 times the mass of the Sun and 3.47 times the radius of the Sun. It radiates 69.1 times the luminosity of the Sun from its photosphere with an effective temperature of 9,886 K. HD 4222 is metal deficient with an iron abundance of [Fe/H] = −0.26 or 55% of the Sun's. At the age of 407 million years, HD 4222 has completed 81.5% of its main sequence lifetime.

HD 4222 and BU 492B make up the binary system BU 492. The companion is a red dwarf with a stellar classification of M2-5V; it is located 1.5" away from the primary along a position angle of 173°. BU 492B was first noticed by astronomer S. W. Burnham in 1878. HD 4222 also has one optical companion; an 11th magnitude star located 88.6" away, which itself is also a double star. An X-ray emission with a luminosity of 3.031×10^{20} W was detected around the star. A-type stars are not expected to emit X-rays, so it might be coming from the companion. HD 4222 is considered to be a probable member of the Sirius supercluster, a group of stars moving with the bright star Sirius and share a common origin with the system.
