= HD 7924 b =

Super-Earth

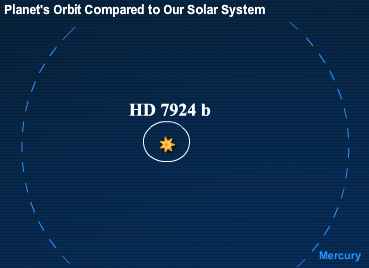
- HD 7924 b's orbit compared to Mercury's (0.38AU).

Discovery
- Discovered by: Howard et al.
- Discovery date: January 28, 2009
- Detection method: radial velocity

Orbital characteristics
- Semi-major axis: 0.057 AU (8,500,000 km)
- Eccentricity: 0.17 ± 0.16
- Orbital period (sidereal): 5.3978 ± 0.0015 d
- Time of periastron: 4727.27 ± 0.87
- Argument of periastron: 25 ± 60
- Star: HD 7924

HD 7924 b is an extrasolar planet located approximately 55 light years away in the constellation of Cassiopeia, orbiting the 7th magnitude K-type main sequence (slightly metal poor) star HD 7924. It was published on January 28, 2009 and is the second planet discovered in the constellation Cassiopeia. Two additional planets in this system were discovered in 2015.

== Super-Earth ==
HD 7924 b is a super-Earth exoplanet with a minimum mass 9.2 times that of Earth and takes only about 129.5 hours to orbit the star, at an average distance of 8,500,000 km (5,300,000 mi). When HD 7924 b was discovered in 2009, it was one of only eight planets known with a minimum mass less than 10 Earths. Also a super-Earth discovery makes 2009 the fifth year in a row since 2005 to have super-Earth planets discovered.

== Characteristics ==
While the radius of HD 7924 b is unknown, depending on its composition, it will be between 1.4–6 times the diameter of the Earth. It is unknown whether this planet is rocky or gaseous. Since the true mass of this planet is not known, it might be gaseous if the true mass is considerably more than minimum mass. If the true mass is near the minimum mass of 9.2 M_{E}, then this planet could be rocky.
