= V523 Cassiopeiae =

Variable star in the constellation Cassiopeia

Observation data Epoch J2000.0 Equinox ICRS
- Constellation: Cassiopeia
- Right ascension: 00^{h} 40^{m} 06.27^{s}
- Declination: +50° 14′ 15.5″
- Apparent magnitude (V): 10.62–11.45

Characteristics

A
- Evolutionary stage: Main-sequence
- Spectral type: K0V + M2V
- B−V color index: 1.078±0.024
- V−R color index: 0.651±0.023
- R−I color index: 0.581±0.032
- Variable type: W UMa

B
- Spectral type: M2V

Astrometry
Radial velocity (R_{v})	-2.54 km/s
Proper motion (μ)	RA: 147.512 mas/yr Dec.: -71.088 mas/yr
Parallax (π)	14.9513±0.017 mas
Distance	218.1 ± 0.2 ly (66.88 ± 0.08 pc)

Orbit
Primary	Aa
Name	Ab
Period (P)	0.23369130(2) d
Semi-major axis (a)	1.66±0.02 R_{☉}
Inclination (i)	81.84±0.03°

Orbit
Primary	A
Name	B
Period (P)	114.8±2.0 years
Semi-major axis (a)	19.7±1.0 au
Eccentricity (e)	0.071±0.002
Argument of periastron (ω) (secondary)	2,446,708.8162(16) HJD°

Details

Aa
Mass	0.753±0.005 M_{☉}
Radius	0.736±0.004 R_{☉}
Luminosity	0.199±0.002 L_{☉}
Surface gravity (log g)	4.55±0.02 cgs
Temperature	4,500 K

Ab
Mass	0.388±0.004 M_{☉}
Radius	0.553±0.003 R_{☉}
Luminosity	0.134±0.001 L_{☉}
Surface gravity (log g)	4.51±0.02 cgs
Temperature	4,699±2 K

B
Mass	0.45±0.01 M_{☉}

Other designations
- V523 Cas, LSPM J0040+5014E, TIC 240706234, TYC 3257-167-1, GSC 03257-00167, 2MASS J00400624+5014156, ASCC 229530, WR 16, CSV 5867, NSVS 3718116, 1RXS J004005.0+501414, SBC9 35, UCAC2 48078055, USNO-B1.0 1402-00018474, WEB 563

Database references
SIMBAD	data

V523 Cassiopeiae (V523 Cas) is an eclipsing binary star system located in the constellation of Cassiopeia. It is classified as an overcontact binary of the W Ursae Majoris (W UMa) type. It has one of the shortest known orbital periods among non-degenerate contact binary systems.

== Observation ==
V523 Cas was first identified as a variable star by F. Weber in 1957 through photographic observations. It was subsequently classified as an EW-type eclipsing binary by H. Haussler in 1974 based on its light curve morphology, which shows two unequal minima indicative of a contact configuration where the secondary eclipse is shallower than the primary.

Photometric monitoring began in the 1980s, with extensive B and V-band observations conducted at Lowell Observatory over three consecutive nights in 1983, revealing the system's short period and stability during that epoch. Radial-velocity spectroscopy, initiated in August 1981, confirmed the binary nature and refined the spectral type to approximately K5. Subsequent campaigns in the 1990s and 2000s utilized multi-filter CCD photometry (B, V, R, I) and near-infrared (JHKs) observations to model the light curves and derive system parameters.

The system has been part of long-term period studies spanning nearly a century, with times of minimum light compiled from visual, photographic, and photoelectric data. It is detectable as an X-ray source, attributed to coronal activity from the chromospheres of its active K-dwarf components.

== Structure ==
The contact binary consists of a thermally disequilibrated pair of K0V and M2V main-sequence stars, overall spectral type K4V, that share a common envelope and are in physical contact, resulting in mutual eclipses that produce its observed variability. The secondary also features strong starspot activity. There is a companion star, also of type M2V, that orbits the main star on a roughly 115-year orbit. There may be a fourth star, another red dwarf, with an orbital period of around 19 years.

The 5.61 h period of the binary is one of the shortest known among contact binaries, but is lengthening by 7.64 ms every year; the tertiary also induces a sinusoidal variation with amplitude 54±7 min in sync with its orbit. Mass is transferring from the secondary to the primary of the contact binary at a rate of about 9.17×10^{−8} M_{☉}/y, faster than the system can thermalize, and it should continue for a few million years until the pair separates and the secondary is much smaller than the primary.
