= HD 240237 b =

Super-Jupiter exoplanet

Discovery
- Discovery date: 9 October 2011
- Detection method: Doppler spectroscopy

Orbital characteristics
- Semi-major axis: 1.9 AU (280,000,000 km)
- Eccentricity: 0.4 (± 0.1)
- Orbital period (sidereal): 745.7 (± 13.8) d
- Time of periastron: 54,292 ± 28.3
- Argument of periastron: 108.1 ± 21.8
- Semi-amplitude: 91.5 ± 12.8
- Star: HD 240237 (BD+57° 2714)

Physical characteristics
- Mean radius: ~1.11 R_{J}
- Mass: 15.89±5.58 M_{J}
- Temperature: 781 K (508 °C; 946 °F)

HD 240237 b is a super-Jupiter exoplanet orbiting the K-type giant star HD 240237 about 4,900 light-years (1,500 parsecs, or nearly 4.6×10^{16} km) away from Earth in the constellation Cassiopeia. It orbits outside of the habitable zone of its star at a distance of 1.9 AU. The exoplanet was found by using the radial velocity method, from radial-velocity measurements via observation of Doppler shifts in the spectrum of the planet's parent star. The planet has a mildly eccentric orbit.

== Characteristics ==
=== Mass, radius and temperature ===
HD 240237 b is a "super-Jupiter", an exoplanet that has a radius and mass larger than that of the gas giants Jupiter and Saturn. It has a temperature of 781 K (508 °C; 946 °F), around that of the surface temperature of Venus. It has an estimated mass of around 15.89 M_{J} and a potential radius of around 9% larger than Jupiter (1.11 R_{J}, or 12.2 R_{🜨}) based on its mass, since it is more massive than the jovian planet.

=== Host star ===
The planet orbits a (K-type) giant star named HD 240237. It has exhausted the hydrogen supply in its core and is currently fusing helium. The star has a mass of 1.69 M_{☉} and a radius of around 71 R_{☉}. It has a surface temperature of 4361K and is likely 2 billion years old based on its mass and evolution. In comparison, the Sun is about 4.6 billion years old and has a surface temperature of 5778 K.

The star's apparent magnitude, or how bright it appears from Earth's perspective, is 8.19. Therefore, HD 240237 is too dim to be seen with the naked eye.

=== Orbit ===
HD 240237 b orbits its star with nearly 331 times the Sun's luminosity (331 L_{☉}) every 746 days at a distance of 1.9 AU (compared to Mars' orbital distance from the Sun, which is 1.52 AU). It has a mildly eccentric orbit, with an eccentricity of 0.4.

== Discovery ==
The planet was detected through Doppler spectroscopy, the method of observing exoplanets through the measurement of radial velocities of a star. If there is a wobble, it could mean that there is a possible planetary companion orbiting it.

Observations were taken with the Hobby–Eberly Telescope equipped with the High-Resolution Spectrograph in a queue-scheduled mode. From July 2004 to October 2009, 40 epochs were measured, with SNR values ranging from 161 to 450. These observations eventually led the team to conclude that there was in fact a planetary companion orbiting around HD 240237, and they estimated its parameters to be a mass of 5.3 times that of Jupiter, an orbital period of 746 days, an eccentricity of 0.4, and a semi-major axis of 1.9 AU. The discovery, along with 2 other exoplanets, were announced on October 9, 2011.

== See also ==
- Epsilon Tauri b
