= BD+60°2522 =

Star in the constellation Cassiopeia

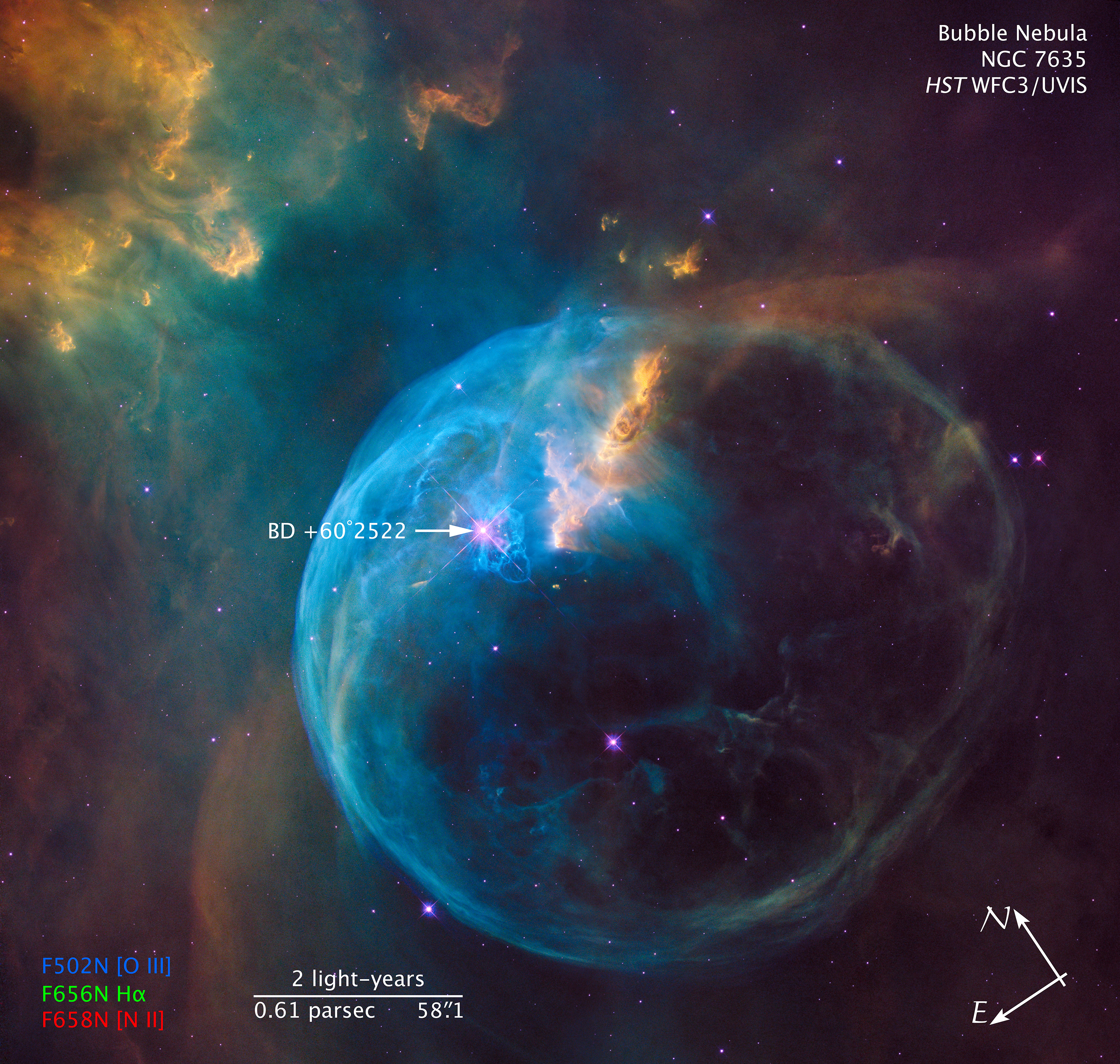
- NGC 7635 surrounding BD+60 2522; Credit: NASA, ESA, and the Hubble Heritage Team (STScI/AURA)

Observation data Epoch J2000 Equinox ICRS
- Constellation: Cassiopeia
- Right ascension: 23^{h} 20^{m} 44.5135^{s}
- Declination: +61° 11′ 40.531″
- Apparent magnitude (V): 8.67

Characteristics
- Evolutionary stage: main sequence
- Spectral type: O6.5(f)(n)p
- U−B color index: −0.62
- B−V color index: +0.41

Astrometry
| Radial velocity (R_{v}) | −26 km/s |
| Proper motion (μ) | RA: −2.662 mas/yr Dec.: 0.388 mas/yr |
| Parallax (π) | 0.3341±0.0152 mas |
| Distance | 9,800 ± 400 ly (3,000 ± 100 pc) |
| Absolute magnitude (M_{V}) | −5.5 |

Details
| Mass | 45 M_{☉} |
| Radius | 15 R_{☉} |
| Luminosity | 457,088 L_{☉} |
| Temperature | 39,500 K |
| Rotational velocity (v sin i) | 178 - 240 km/s |
| Age | 2 Myr |

Other designations
- SAO 20575, IRAS 23185+6055, 2MASS J23204452+6111404

Database references
| SIMBAD | data |

BD+60°2522 is a bright O-type star that has produced the Bubble Nebula (NGC 7635) with its stellar wind. The exact classification of the star is uncertain, with a number of spectral peculiarities and inconsistencies between the appearance of the star itself and the effects on the nearby nebulosity, but it is undoubtedly a highly luminous hot massive star. Direct spectroscopy yields a spectral class of O6.5 and an effective temperature around 39,500 K. It is a member of the Cassiopeia OB2 stellar association in the Perseus Arm of the galaxy at about 8,500 light-years' distance.

Although BD+60°2522 is around two million years old, the surrounding nebula is apparently only about 40,000 years old. The bubble is expected to be formed as a shock front where the stellar wind meets interstellar material at supersonic speeds. The wind from BD+60°2522 is travelling outwards at 1,800–2,500 km/s, causing the star to lose over a millionth of the mass of the Sun every year. It has already lost approximately 25% of its initial mass and is roughly halfway through its main sequence life.
