= HD 7924 =

Star in the constellation Cassiopeia

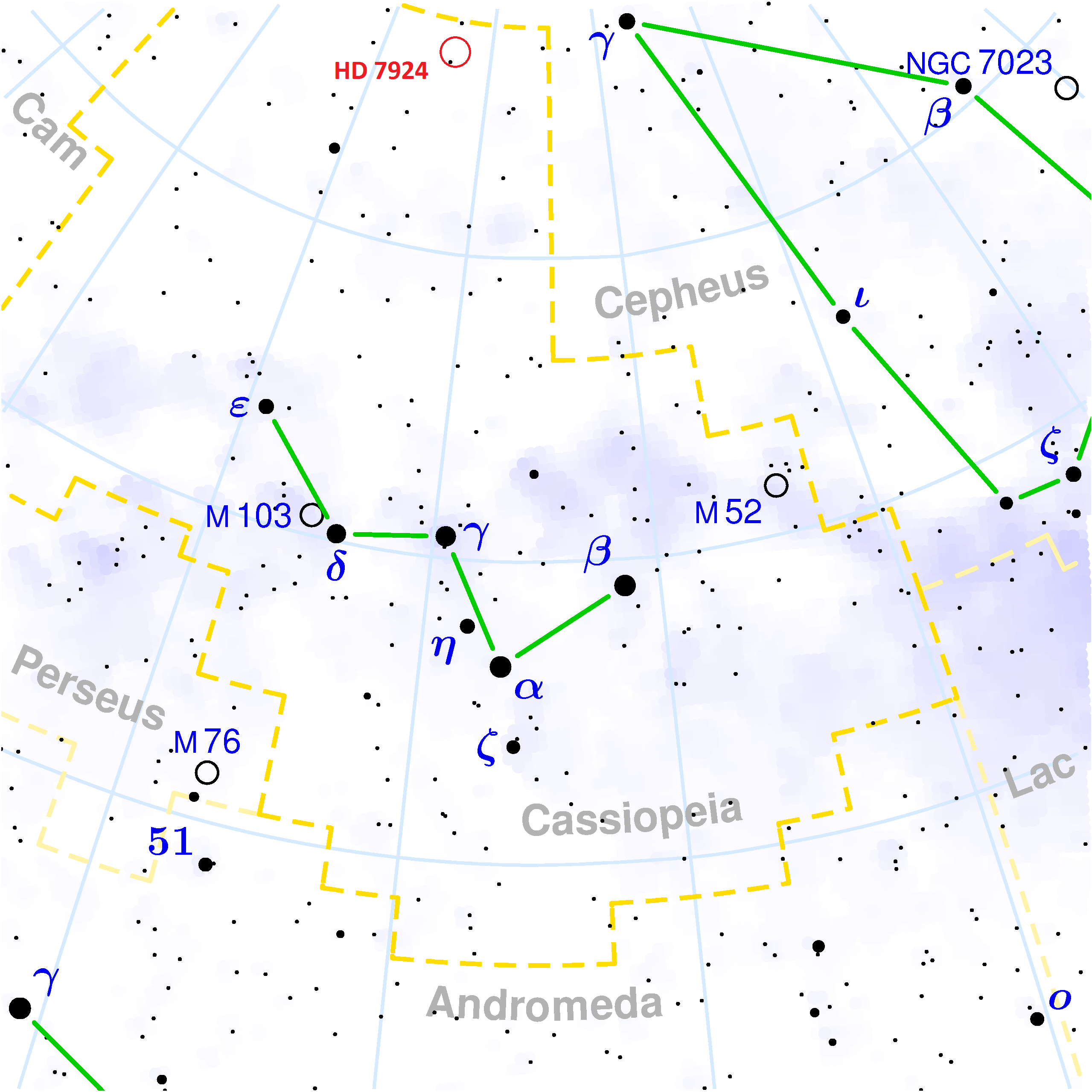
- Position of star HD 7924 in the constellation Cassiopeia

Observation data Epoch J2000.0 Equinox ICRS
- Constellation: Cassiopeia
- Right ascension: 01^{h} 21^{m} 59.11373^{s}
- Declination: +76° 42′ 37.0383″
- Apparent magnitude (V): 7.167

Characteristics
- Evolutionary stage: main sequence
- Spectral type: K0.5V
- Apparent magnitude (B): 8.005
- Apparent magnitude (J): 5.618
- Apparent magnitude (H): 5.231
- Apparent magnitude (K): 5.159
- B−V color index: +0.826±0.006

Astrometry
Radial velocity (R_{v})	−22.81±0.12 km/s
Proper motion (μ)	RA: −34.767±0.016 mas/yr Dec.: −32.724±0.019 mas/yr
Parallax (π)	58.8125±0.0168 mas
Distance	55.46 ± 0.02 ly (17.003 ± 0.005 pc)
Absolute magnitude (M_{V})	6.04

Details
Mass	0.81±0.01 M_{☉}
Radius	0.74±0.01 R_{☉}
Luminosity	0.364±0.001 L_{☉}
Surface gravity (log g)	4.6±0.01 cgs
Temperature	5,216±13 K
Metallicity [Fe/H]	−0.15±0.03 dex
Rotational velocity (v sin i)	0.9 km/s
Age	3.0±1.8 Gyr

Other designations
- BD+75°58, GJ 56.5, HD 7924, HIP 6379, SAO 4386, PPM 4675, TYC 4494-1346-1, GCRV 766, GSC 04494-01396, 2MASS J01215911+7642372

Database references
SIMBAD	data
Exoplanet Archive	data
ARICNS	data

HD 7924 is a single star located 55.5 light years away from the Sun in the northern constellation of Cassiopeia, near the northern constellation border with Cepheus. It has an orange hue and is only visible by means of binoculars or a telescope due to a low apparent visual magnitude of 7.167. The star is drifting closer to the Sun with a radial velocity of –22.81 km/s, and is expected to approach to within 9.3 light-years in around 711,700 years.

This is a K-type main-sequence star with a stellar classification of K0.5V. Low-level chromospheric activity has been detected, with the star showing spots and an activity cycle. The star is about three billion years old and is spinning with a projected rotational velocity of just 0.9 km/s. It has 81% of the mass of the Sun and 74% of the Sun's radius. The metal content is about seven-tenths as much as the Sun. It is radiating 36.4% of the luminosity of the Sun from its photosphere at an effective temperature of 5,216 K.

== Planetary system ==
In 2009, a super-Earth exoplanet was found in orbit around the star. In 2015, two more planets were discovered, and the mass of the original planet was revised downwards slightly. It is possible that planets c and d are in the 8:5 mean motion resonance. All of the planets lie below the star's habitable zone.

The HD 7924 planetary system
Companion (in order from star)	Mass	Semimajor axis (AU)	Orbital period (days)	Eccentricity	Inclination (°)	Radius
b	≥ 8.68±0.52 M_{🜨}	0.05664±0.00068	5.39792±0.00025	0.058 ^{+0.056}_{−0.040}	—	—
c	≥ 7.86±0.72 M_{🜨}	0.1134±0.0014	15.299±0.0033	0.098 ^{+0.096}_{−0.069}	—	—
d	≥ 6.44±0.79 M_{🜨}	0.1551±0.0019	24.451±0.016	0.21 ^{+0.13}_{−0.12}	—	—

== See also ==
- List of extrasolar planets
