= Bubble Nebula =

Emission nebula in the constellation Cassiopeia

NGC 7635
Emission nebula
- H II region
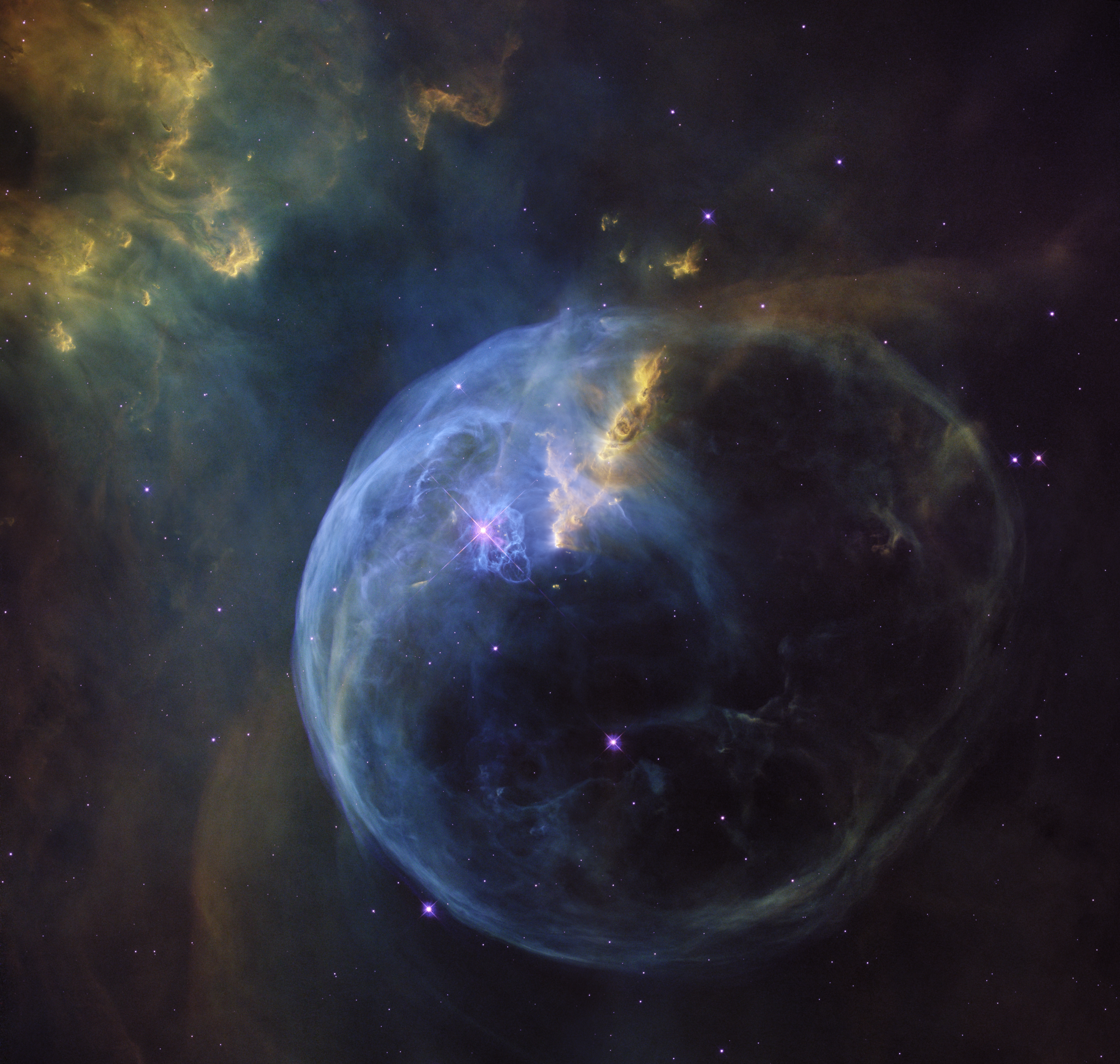
- Wide field image of NGC 7635 as captured by the Hubble Space Telescope

Observation data: J2000 epoch
- Right ascension: 23^{h} 20^{m} 48.3^{s}
- Declination: +61° 12′ 06″
- Distance: 7100 to 11000 ly (3,400 pc)
- Apparent magnitude (V): 10
- Apparent dimensions (V): 15′ × 8′
- Constellation: Cassiopeia

Physical characteristics
- Radius: 3 to 5 ly
- Notable features: Shell around BD+60°2522
- Designations: Bubble Nebula; Sharpless 162 (Sh2-162); Caldwell 11

The Bubble Nebula, also known as NGC 7635, Sharpless 162, or Caldwell 11, is an H II region emission nebula in the constellation Cassiopeia. It lies close to the open cluster Messier 52. The "bubble" is created by the stellar wind from a massive hot, 8.7 magnitude young central star, SAO 20575 (BD+60°2522). The nebula is near a giant molecular cloud which contains the expansion of the bubble nebula while itself being excited by the hot central star, causing it to glow. It was discovered in November 1787 by William Herschel. The star BD+60°2522 is thought to have a mass of about 44 M_{☉}.

== Amateur observation ==
With an 8-or-10-inch (200 or 250 mm) telescope, the nebula is visible as an extremely faint and large shell around the star. The nearby 7th magnitude star on the west hinders observation, but one can view the nebula using averted vision. Using a 16-to-18-inch (410 to 460 mm) scope, one can see that the faint nebula is irregular, being elongated in the north south direction.

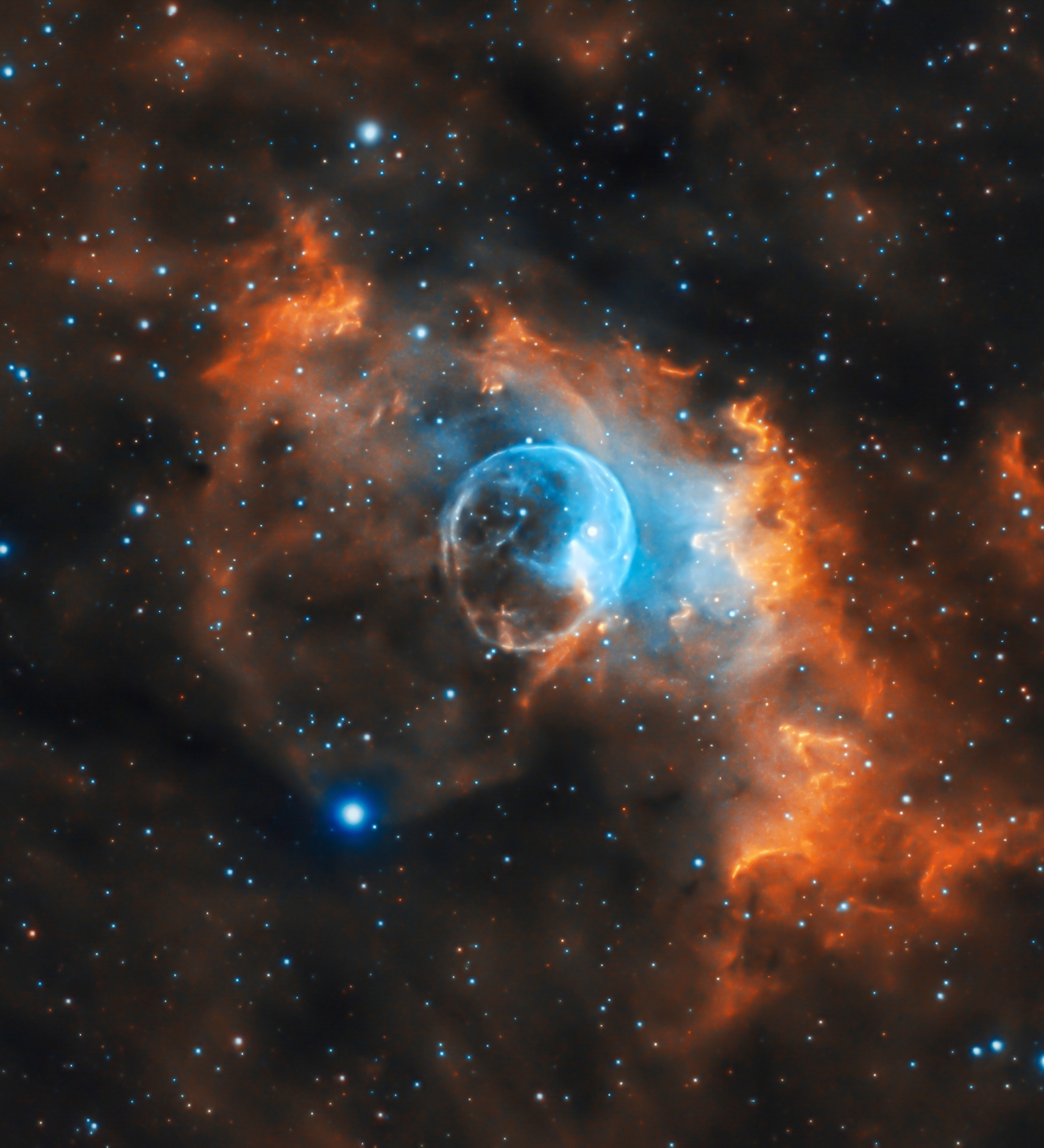
NGC 7635 and its environs imaged through an 8-inch amateur telescope

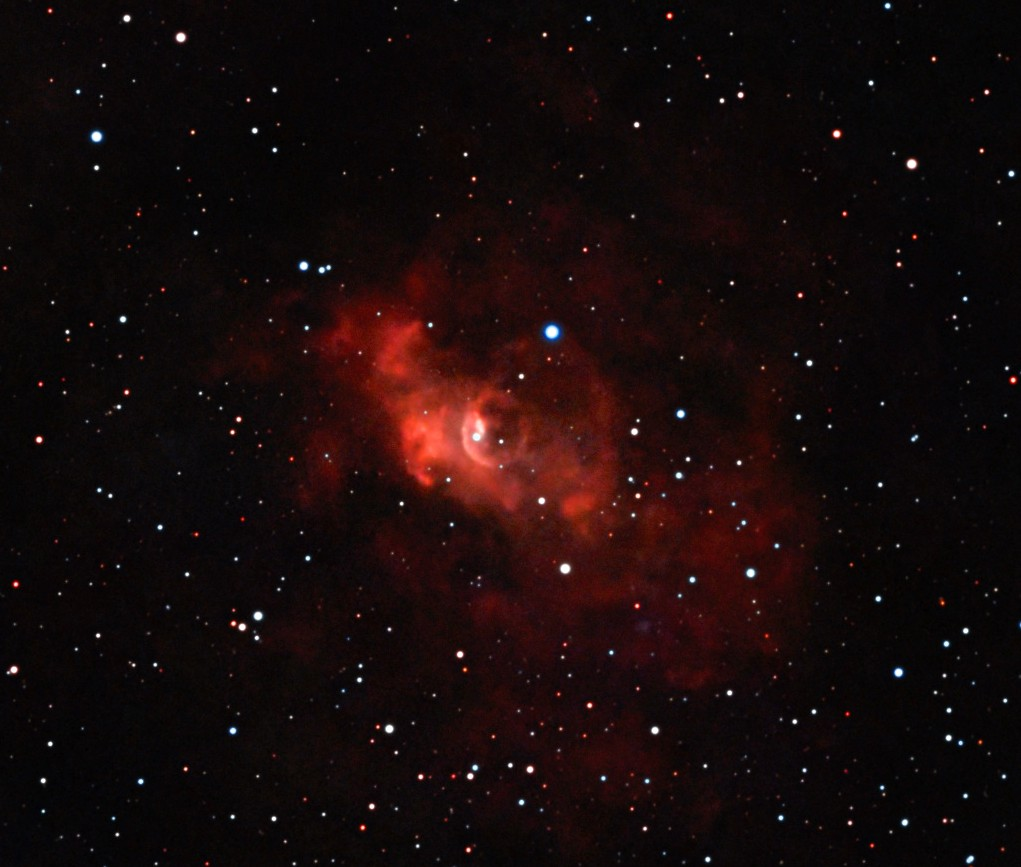
Bubble Nebula imaged with a Dwarf3 Smart Telescope taken with a capture over the course of 5 hours

== See also ==
- Lists of nebulae
