= HD 223960 =

Star in the constellation Cassiopeia

Observation data Epoch J2000 Equinox J2000
- Constellation: Cassiopeia
- Right ascension: 23^{h} 53^{m} 49.98300^{s}
- Declination: +60° 51′ 12.2438″

Characteristics
- Evolutionary stage: blue supergiant
- Spectral type: B9Ia
- U−B color index: −0.050
- B−V color index: +0.715
- Variable type: α Cyg

Astrometry
Radial velocity (R_{v})	−48.1 km/s
Proper motion (μ)	RA: −3.009 mas/yr Dec.: −2.205 mas/yr
Parallax (π)	0.3413±0.0147 mas
Distance	9,600 ± 400 ly (2,900 ± 100 pc)
Absolute magnitude (M_{V})	−6.9

Details
Mass	19.2 M_{☉}
Radius	89 R_{☉}
Luminosity	315,000+99,000 −75,000 L_{☉}
Surface gravity (log g)	1.48±0.10 cgs
Temperature	10,700±200 K
Metallicity [Fe/H]	+0.02 dex
Rotational velocity (v sin i)	32 km/s

Other designations
- V819 Cassiopeiae, BD+60°2636, HD 223960, HIP 117830

Database references
SIMBAD	data

HD 223960 is a supergiant star in the northern constellation Cassiopeia. Its brightness varies slightly around apparent magnitude 7 which makes it hard to be seen by the naked eye even from dark skies. Parallax measurements by the Gaia spacecraft suggest a distance of around 9,600 light years.

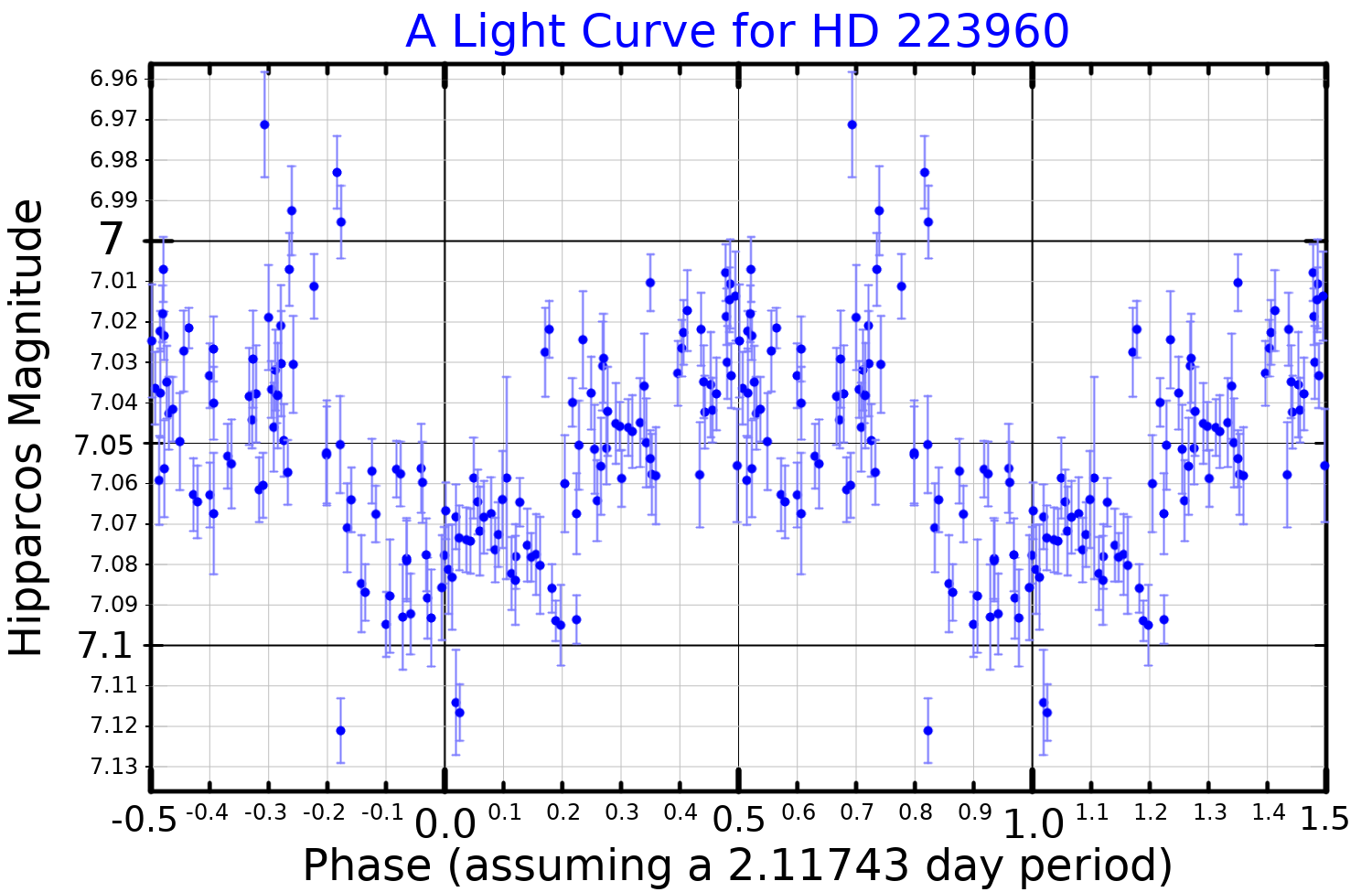
A light curve for HD 223960, plotted from Hipparcos data

HD 223960 is tentatively classified as an α Cygni variable; its brightness changes erratically by less than a tenth of a magnitude with a primary period of about two days. It is a hot supergiant star with a luminosity several hundred thousand times higher than the Sun's.
