= BS Cassiopeiae =

Binary star in the constellation Cassiopeia

Observation data Epoch J2000.0 Equinox ICRS
- Constellation: Cassiopeia
- Right ascension: 01^{h} 21^{m} 38.574^{s}
- Declination: +59° 10′ 26.972″
- Apparent magnitude (V): 11.84±0.13 (Min: 12.5)

Characteristics
- B−V color index: 0.50
- Variable type: W UMa

Astrometry
Proper motion (μ)	RA: 2.186 mas/yr Dec.: 4.425 mas/yr
Parallax (π)	2.5033±0.0258 mas
Distance	1,300 ± 10 ly (399 ± 4 pc)

Details

Primary
Mass	1.423±0.031 M_{☉}
Radius	1.473±0.010 R_{☉}
Luminosity	3.093±0.149 L_{☉}
Temperature	6,262±56 K

Secondary
Mass	0.566±0.011 M_{☉}
Radius	0.986±0.007 R_{☉}
Luminosity	1.507±0.078 L_{☉}
Temperature	6,307±73 K

Other designations
- BS Cas, TIC 369992913, 2MASS J01213857+5910268

Database references
SIMBAD	data

BS Cassiopeiae is a binary star system in the northern constellation of Cassiopeia. Its name is a variable star designation, abbreviated BS Cas. It has a peak apparent visual magnitude of 11.8, which decreases to 12.5 during an eclipse. Based on parallax measurements, it is located at a distance of approximately 1,300 light-years (399 pc).

== Observations ==
The variability of this target was announced by S. Beljawsky in 1931. C. Hoffmeister determined it to be an eclipsing binary system of the W UMa type, where the two components are in direct physical contact. In 2003, an orbital period of 10.571264 hours was determined, then was refined to 10.571230 hours in 2004.

In 2008, the first photometric light curve of this system was published, which demonstrated the O'Connell effect. The measurements showed a cyclic variation in amplitude with a period of around 13 years. There is a long-term decrease in the orbital period, which suggests mass transfer is occurring. This decrease was measured at a rate of −2.45×10^{−7} d·yr^{−1}. The temperature difference between the two components was found to be 190 K.

This pair consists of a contact binary of the W-subtype with a cooler, more massive component and a hotter, less massive component. The estimated mass transfer rate is 1.129×10^{−7} M_{☉}·yr^{−1}. The system displays a signature of a third body along the same line of sight, which has an estimated minimum mass in the range 0.24–0.86 M_{☉}. This body may be responsible for an 18.376 year modulation, caused by light travel effect. Variations in the eclipse timing maxima and minima is likely due to high latitude star spots.
