= Upsilon2 Cassiopeiae =

Star in the constellation Cassiopeia

υ^{2} Cassiopeiae
- Location of υ^{2} Cassiopeiae (circled)

Observation data Epoch J2000.0 Equinox J2000.0
- Constellation: Cassiopeia
- Right ascension: 00^{h} 56^{m} 39.905^{s}
- Declination: +59° 10′ 51.81″
- Apparent magnitude (V): +4.62

Characteristics
- Evolutionary stage: horizontal branch
- Spectral type: G8 IIIb Fe−0.5
- U−B color index: +0.68
- B−V color index: +0.96

Astrometry
Radial velocity (R_{v})	−47.73±0.12 km/s
Proper motion (μ)	RA: −92.611 mas/yr Dec.: −45.397 mas/yr
Parallax (π)	16.6465±0.0859 mas
Distance	196 ± 1 ly (60.1 ± 0.3 pc)
Absolute magnitude (M_{V})	+0.62

Details
Mass	1.44±0.16 M_{☉}
Radius	10.44+0.24 −0.50 R_{☉}
Luminosity	55.3±0.7 L_{☉}
Surface gravity (log g)	2.75±0.19 cgs
Temperature	4,937±14 K
Metallicity [Fe/H]	−0.35±0.03 dex
Rotational velocity (v sin i)	0.54±0.38 km/s
Age	2.20±0.62 Gyr

Other designations
- Castula, υ^{2} Cas, 28 Cassiopeiae, BD+58°138, HD 5395, HIP 4422, HR 265, SAO 21855

Database references
SIMBAD	data

Upsilon^{2} Cassiopeiae is a solitary star in the constellation of Cassiopeia, a few degrees to the south of Gamma Cassiopeiae. It has the proper name Castula /ˈkæstjʊlə/, which has been officially adopted by the IAU. The star has a yellow hue and is faintly visible to the naked eye with an apparent visual magnitude of +4.62. Based upon parallax measurements, it is located at a distance of approximately 189 light years from the Sun. The star is drifting closer with a radial velocity of −48 km/s.

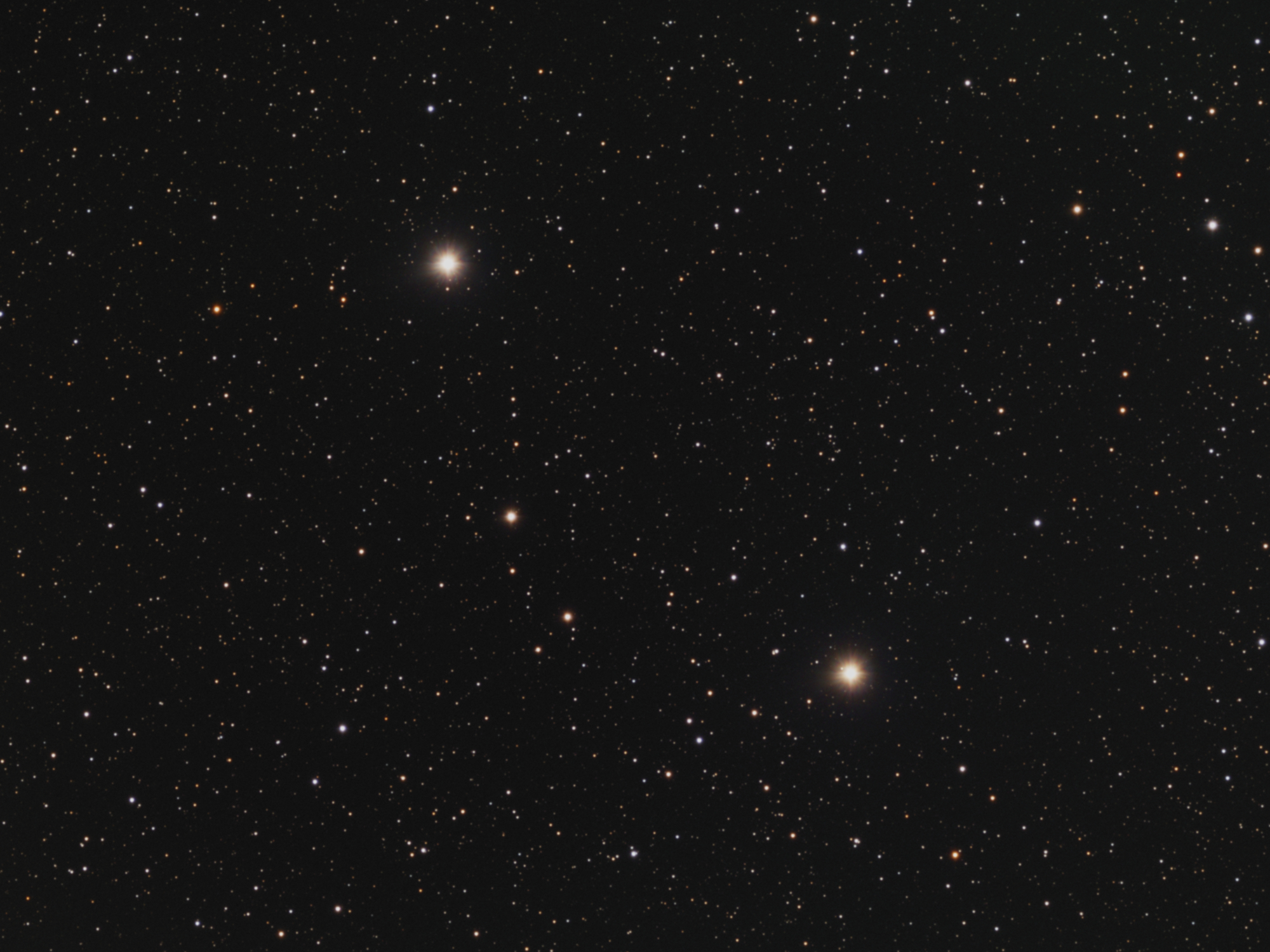
υ^{2} Cassiopeiae is the bright star in the upper left. The bright star in the lower right is υ^{1} Cassiopeiae.

This is an aging giant star with a stellar classification of G8 IIIb Fe−0.5, where the suffix notation indicates a mild underabundance of iron in the spectrum. With the supply of core hydrogen exhausted, this star has cooled and expanded off the main sequence – at present it has 10 times the girth of the Sun. It is a red clump giant, which means it is on the horizontal branch undergoing core helium fusion.

Upsilon^{2} Cassiopeiae is a barium star, showing an excess of the element barium in its spectrum. This can occur from mass transfer from a more-evolved companion star that later became a white dwarf, although no companion has been detected. It is 2.2 billion years old with 1.44 times the mass of the Sun. The star is radiating 55 times the luminosity of the Sun from its enlarged photosphere at an effective temperature of 4,937 K.

== Nomenclature ==
Upsilon^{2} Cassiopeiae, Latinised from υ^{2} Cassiopeiae, is the star's Bayer designation, abbreviated Upsilon^{2} Cas or υ^{2} Cas.

This star bore the name Castula in Bayer's Uranometria, which is Latin for a type of woman's tunic. In 2016, the IAU organized a Working Group on Star Names (WGSN) to catalog and standardize proper names for stars. The WGSN approved the name Castula for this star on 5 September 2017 and it is now so included in the List of IAU-approved Star Names.
