= HR 273 =

Binary star system in the constellation Cassiopeia

- Location of HR 273 (circled)

Observation data Epoch J2000 Equinox ICRS
- Constellation: Cassiopeia
- Right ascension: 00^{h} 58^{m} 31.06200^{s}
- Declination: +66° 21′ 06.4576″
- Apparent magnitude (V): 5.97

Characteristics
- Spectral type: A0 III
- U−B color index: −0.13
- B−V color index: −0.02

Astrometry
Radial velocity (R_{v})	−10.3 km/s
Proper motion (μ)	RA: +44.139 mas/yr Dec.: −12.957 mas/yr
Parallax (π)	9.1239±0.0375 mas
Distance	357 ± 1 ly (109.6 ± 0.5 pc)
Absolute magnitude (M_{V})	0.3

Orbit
Period (P)	6.82054 days
Eccentricity (e)	0
Inclination (i)	20.5°
Semi-amplitude (K_{1}) (primary)	24.60 km/s
Semi-amplitude (K_{2}) (secondary)	38.43 km/s

Details

A
Mass	2.5 M_{☉}
Surface gravity (log g)	4.0 cgs
Temperature	11,400 K

B
Surface gravity (log g)	4.5 cgs
Temperature	7,800 K
Rotational velocity (v sin i)	3.2+0.3 −1.9 km/s

Other designations
- HR 273, HD 5550, HIP 4572, BD+65°115

Database references
SIMBAD	data

HR 273 is a chemically peculiar spectroscopic binary system in the northern circumpolar constellation of Cassiopeia. It has an apparent visual magnitude of 5.9 making it faintly visible to the naked eye from dark suburban skies. Parallax measurements with the Gaia spacecraft put this system at a distance of roughly 357 light years.

The primary, HR 273 A, is an Ap star and the secondary is an Am star, making this a very unusual binary system. The primary has a magnetic field of 65 gauss, amongst the weakest seen in any Ap star. The magnetic field in the secondary is too weak to detect.

Component A has a spectral type of A0 III, and has unusually strong lines of strontium, chromium, and europium so it is known as a SrCrEu star. Although some spectral lines of the secondary star can be clearly distinguished, its spectral type cannot be clearly assigned. It is thought to be a late class A star, cooler than the primary. The primary star has been rotationally braked so that its rotational period closely matches its orbital period.
