= Upsilon1 Cassiopeiae =

Star in the constellation Cassiopeia

υ^{1} Cassiopeiae
- Location of υ^{1} Cassiopeiae (circled)

Observation data Epoch J2000.0 Equinox J2000.0 (ICRS)
- Constellation: Cassiopeia
- Right ascension: 00^{h} 55^{m} 00.156^{s}
- Declination: +58° 58′ 21.72″
- Apparent magnitude (V): 4.82

Characteristics
- Evolutionary stage: red clump
- Spectral type: K2 III
- U−B color index: +1.25
- B−V color index: +1.21

Astrometry
Radial velocity (R_{v})	−23.57 km/s
Proper motion (μ)	RA: −31.200 mas/yr Dec.: −44.986 mas/yr
Parallax (π)	9.062±0.107 mas
Distance	360 ± 4 ly (110 ± 1 pc)
Absolute magnitude (M_{V})	−0.644

Details
Mass	1.39 M_{☉}
Radius	21 R_{☉}
Luminosity	174 L_{☉}
Surface gravity (log g)	1.76 cgs
Temperature	4,422±14 K
Metallicity [Fe/H]	−0.25 dex
Rotational velocity (v sin i)	1.1 km/s
Age	4.75 Gyr

Other designations
- υ^{1} Cas, 26 Cas, BD+58°134, HD 5234, HIP 4292, HR 253, SAO 21832, ADS 748, CCDM J00551+5858, WDS J00550+5858A

Database references
SIMBAD	data

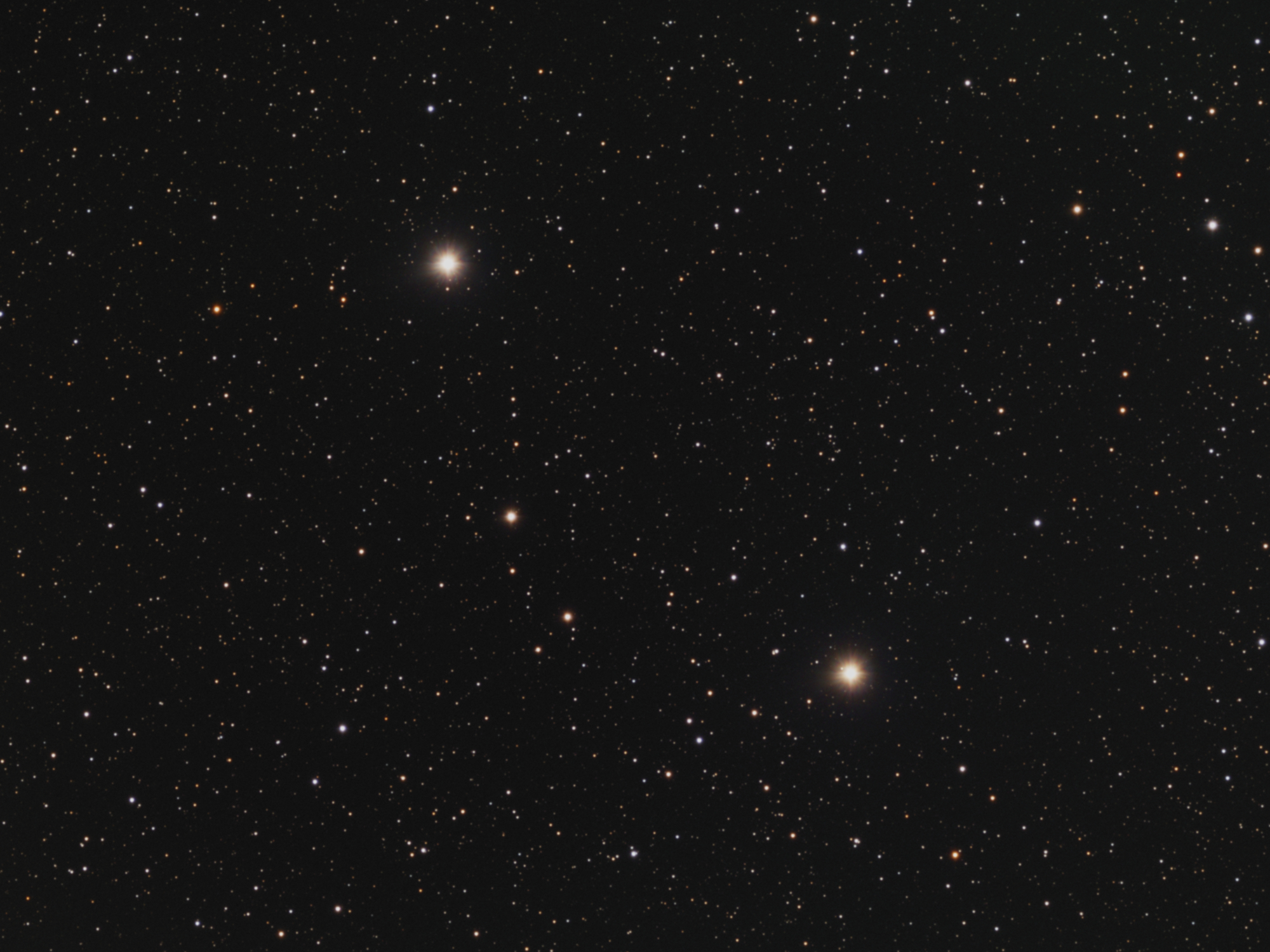
υ^{1} Cassiopeiae is the bright star in the lower right. The bright star in the upper left is υ^{2} Cassiopeiae.

Upsilon^{1} Cassiopeiae is an astrometric binary star system in the northern constellation of Cassiopeia. Its name is a Bayer designation that is Latinized from υ^{1} Cassiopeiae, and abbreviated Upsilon^{1} Cas or υ^{1} Cas. This system visible to the naked eye with an apparent visual magnitude of 4.82. Based upon an annual parallax shift of 9.93 mas as seen from Earth, this system is located about 330 light years from the Sun. It is drifting closer to the Sun with a radial velocity of −24 km/s.

The visible component is an evolved K-type giant star with a stellar classification of K2 III. With an estimated age of 4.75 billion years, it is a red clump star that is generating energy through the fusion of helium at its core. The measured angular diameter, after correction for limb darkening, is 1.97±0.02 mas. At the estimated distance of the star, this yields a physical size of about 21 times the radius of the Sun. It has 1.39 times the mass of the Sun and is radiating 174 times the Sun's luminosity from its expanded photosphere at an effective temperature of 4,422 K.

There is a magnitude 12.50 visual companion at an angular separation of 17.80 arc seconds along a position angle of 61°, as of 2003. A more distant magnitude 12.89 companion lies at a separation of 93.30 arc seconds along a position angle of 125°, as measured in 2003. Neither star appears to be physically associated with υ^{1} Cas.
