= Alpha Cassiopeiae =

Star in the constellation Cassiopeia

α Cassiopeiae
- Location of α Cassiopeiae (circled)

Observation data Epoch J2000 Equinox ICRS
- Constellation: Cassiopeia
- Right ascension: 00^{h} 40^{m} 30.4411^{s}
- Declination: +56° 32′ 14.392″
- Apparent magnitude (V): 2.240

Characteristics
- Evolutionary stage: horizontal branch
- Spectral type: K0-IIIa
- U−B color index: 1.14
- B−V color index: 1.170
- Variable type: Suspected

Astrometry
Radial velocity (R_{v})	−4.31 km/s
Proper motion (μ)	RA: 50.88 mas/yr Dec.: −32.13 mas/yr
Parallax (π)	14.29±0.15 mas
Distance	228 ± 2 ly (70.0 ± 0.7 pc)
Absolute magnitude (M_{V})	−2.01

Details
Mass	4.98±0.45 M_{☉}
Radius	43.14±1.50 R_{☉}
Luminosity	734±52 L_{☉}
Surface gravity (log g)	1.73 cgs
Temperature	4,625±42 K
Metallicity [Fe/H]	–0.2 dex
Rotational velocity (v sin i)	6.71 km/s
Age	220 Myr

Other designations
- Schedar, α Cas, Alpha Cas, 18 Cas, BD+55°139, FK5 21, GC 792, HD 3712, HIP 3179, HR 168, SAO 21609, ADS 561, CCDM J00405+5632, WDS J00405+5632A

Database references
SIMBAD	data

Alpha Cassiopeiae is a star in the northern constellation of Cassiopeia. It has the proper name Schedar, pronounced /ˈʃɛdɑːr/); Alpha Cassiopeiae is its Bayer designation, which is Latinized from α Cassiopeiae and abbreviated Alpha Cas or α Cas. Though listed as the "alpha star" by Johann Bayer, α Cas's visual brightness closely matches the 'beta' (β) star in the constellation (Beta Cassiopeiae) and it may appear marginally brighter or dimmer, depending on which passband is used. However, recent calculations from NASA's WISE telescope confirm that α Cas is the brightest in Cassiopeia, with an apparent magnitude of 2.240. Its absolute magnitude is 18 times greater than β Cas, and it is located over four times farther away from the Sun.

== Nomenclature ==
α Cassiopeiae (Latinised to Alpha Cassiopeiae) is the star's Bayer designation.

It bore the traditional name Schedar, which was first encountered in the Alfonsine tables of the thirteenth century. It derives from the Arabic word صدر şadr, meaning "breast" (as in chest), a word which is derived from its relative position in the heart of the mythological queen Cassiopeia. Johannes Hevelius used the name Schedir in his writings, although there were additional traditional spellings of this Arabic transliteration such as Shedar, Shadar, Sheder, Seder, Shedis, and Shedir. In 2016, the International Astronomical Union organized a Working Group on Star Names (WGSN) to catalogue and standardize proper names for stars. The WGSN approved the name Schedar for this star on 21 August 2016 and it is now so included in the List of IAU-approved Star Names.

Al-Sufi and Ulug Beg named the star Al Dhāt al Kursiyy (Arabic ذات الكرسي, meaning "the lady in the chair"), which Giovanni Battista Riccioli changed to Dath Elkarti.

In Chinese, 王良 (Wáng Liáng) refers to the Chinese asterism Wang Liang, a famous charioteer during the Spring and Autumn period. The stellar pattern consists of Alpha, Beta, Kappa, Eta and Lambda Cassiopeiae. Consequently, the Chinese name for Alpha Cassiopeiae itself is 王良四 (Wáng Liáng sì, English: the Fourth Star of Wang Liang).

== Visibility ==
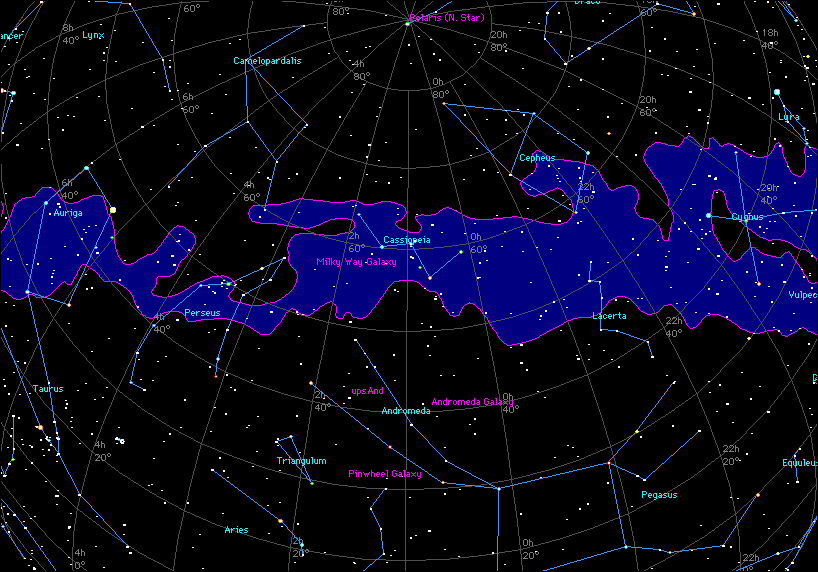
Cassiopeia in the context of the Milky Way

With a declination of 56° 32' North, α Cassiopeiae is principally visible in the Northern Hemisphere. The star is detectable to most observers across the globe reaching as far south as Perth, Australia, Santiago, Chile and other settlements north ± 33° South latitude, albeit close to the horizon. α Cassiopeiae is located in line-of-sight of the Milky Way galaxy, so there are other notable celestial objects that can be viewed close to this star—such as the Pacman Nebula, NGC 436 and NGC 457.

Alpha Cas reaches its zenith above cities like Edinburgh, Copenhagen and Moscow. It is circumpolar throughout Europe, Russia, and as far south as Los Angeles, California on the North American continent as well as other locations around the globe having a latitude greater than ± 33° North. Since α Cassiopeiae is listed as a second-magnitude star (equal to Beta Cas), it is easily observable to the naked eye as long as one's stargazing is not hindered by the light pollution common to most cities.

The best time for observation is during the late autumn months of the Northern Hemisphere, when Cassiopeia passes the meridian at midnight, but given its circumpolar nature in many northern localities, it is visible to many of the world's inhabitants throughout the year.

== Properties ==
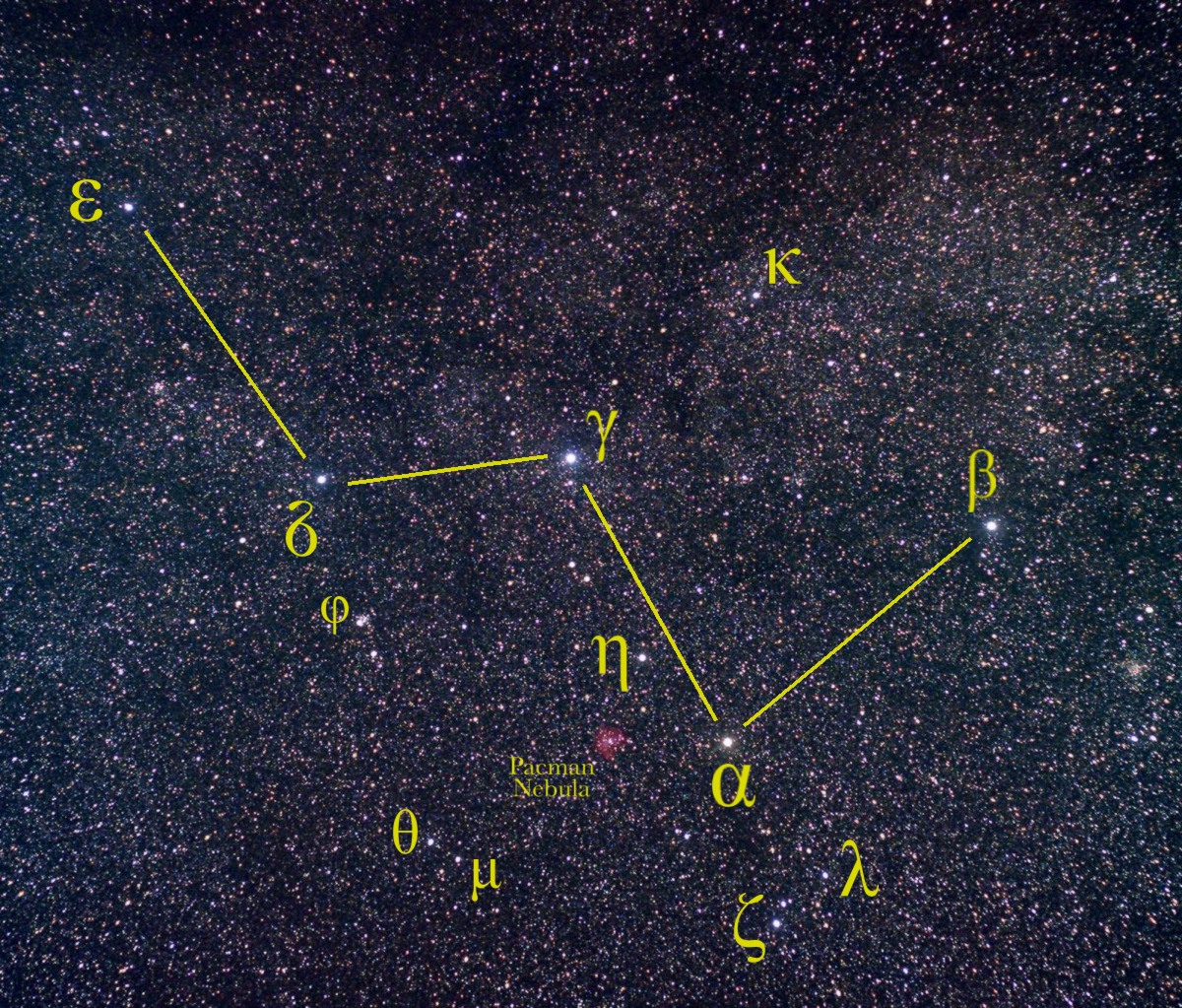
Cassiopeia starfield showing α Cas, the orange giant, in relation to the other stars in the constellation

α Cassiopeiae is a red giant star whose spectral classification is K0-IIIa, notably cooler than the Sun. However, because it is nearing the final stages of its evolution, the photosphere has expanded substantially, yielding a bolometric luminosity that is approximately 800 L_{☉}. It is considered 98% likely to be a horizontal branch star fusing helium in its core.

According to Hipparcos, the New Reduction (van Leeuwen, 2007), the estimated distance to the star is about 70 parsecs or 228 light-years. Like all giant stars, α Cassiopeiae rotates slowly with an approximate velocity of 6.7 km/s—a speed which takes the star approximately 102 days to make one complete revolution on its axis.

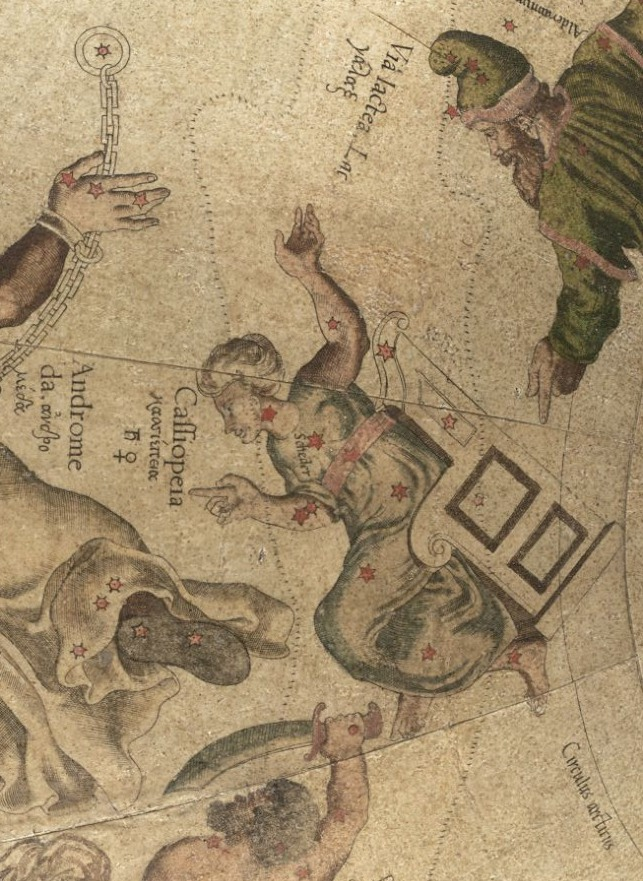
Illustration from Gerardus Mercator showing α Cassiopeiae near the heart of the celestial Queen

α Cassiopeiae has been sometimes classified as a variable star, but no variability has been detected since the 19th century. Also, three companions to the star have been listed in the Washington Double Star Catalog, but it seems that all of them are just distant line-of-sight optical components.

α Cassiopeiae is thought to be around 100 to 200 million years old, having spent much of that time as a blue-white B-type main-sequence star.

With the advances in optical interferometry in the 1990s, α Cassiopeiae's angular diameter was measured in 1998 at various wavelengths ranging from 500 to 850 nm. The result was a limb darkened angular measurement of 5.42±0.06 milliarcseconds (mas).

Later measurements have been made since then, for example, observations with the CHARA Array yield an uniform disk angular diameter of 5.502±0.023 mas in the H band and 5.529±0.007 mas in the K band. The limb-darkened angular diameter combining both wavelengths is 5.664±0.010 mas, yielding a radius of 43.14 ± 1.50 R_{☉} (0.2006 ± 0.0070 au; 30,010,000 ± 1,040,000 km) at the star's distance.

== Depiction ==
In 1551, Gerardus Mercator, a Flemish cartographer, produced a celestial globe portraying the 48 traditional Ptolemaic constellations in addition to two others, Coma Berenices and Antinous. On this globe, he represents Cassiopeia as the Queen of Ethiopia, punished for her boasting by being chained to a chair hanging upside-down. α Cassiopeiae is found near her left breast, reflecting its Arabic etymological origin.
