= Eta Cassiopeiae =

Binary star system in the constellation Cassiopeia

- Location of η Cassiopeiae (circled) in the constellation Cassiopeia

Observation data Epoch J2000 Equinox ICRS
- Constellation: Cassiopeia
- Right ascension: 00^{h} 49^{m} 06.295^{s}
- Declination: +57° 48′ 54.64″
- Apparent magnitude (V): 3.44/7.51

Characteristics
- Spectral type: G0 V + K7 V
- U−B color index: +0.02/1.03
- B−V color index: +0.58/1.39
- Variable type: RS CVn?

Astrometry

A
Radial velocity (R_{v})	+10.0±0.1 km/s
Proper motion (μ)	RA: +1078.609 mas/yr Dec.: −551.133 mas/yr
Parallax (π)	168.8322±0.1663 mas
Distance	19.32 ± 0.02 ly (5.923 ± 0.006 pc)
Absolute magnitude (M_{V})	4.57

B
Proper motion (μ)	RA: +1,144.693 mas/yr Dec.: −469.668 mas/yr
Parallax (π)	168.7186±0.0216 mas
Distance	19.331 ± 0.002 ly (5.9270 ± 0.0008 pc)

Orbit
Primary	η Cas A
Name	η Cas B
Period (P)	472.2±1.1 yr
Semi-major axis (a)	70.55±0.15 AU
Eccentricity (e)	0.49416±0.00070
Inclination (i)	34.938±0.078°
Longitude of the node (Ω)	98.31±0.15°
Periastron epoch (T)	1889.6
Argument of periastron (ω) (secondary)	88.34±0.25°

Details

η Cas A
Mass	1.0258+0.0070 −0.0069 M_{☉}
Radius	1.036±0.011 R_{☉}
Luminosity	1.13±0.03 L_{☉}
Surface gravity (log g)	4.22±0.08 cgs
Temperature	5,879±27 K
Metallicity [Fe/H]	−0.26±0.03 dex
Rotational velocity (v sin i)	3.15 km/s
Age	5.4±0.9 Gyr

η Cas B
Mass	0.5487±0.0056 M_{☉}
Radius	0.57+0.02 −0.03 R_{☉}
Luminosity	0.082±0.000 L_{☉}
Surface gravity (log g)	4.750±0.005 cgs
Temperature	4,011±38 K

Other designations
- Achird, η Cas, 24 Cassiopeiae, BD+57°150, GC 962, GJ 34, HD 4614, HIP 3821, HR 219, SAO 21732, ADS 671, CCDM J00491+5749, LFT 74, LHS 123/122, LTT 10287, Wolf 24

Database references
SIMBAD	The system
- A
- B

Eta Cassiopeiae is a binary star system in the northern constellation of Cassiopeia. Its name is a Bayer designation that is Latinized from η Cassiopeiae and abbreviated Eta Cas or η Cas. The binary nature of this system was first discovered by William Herschel in August 1779. Based upon parallax measurements, the distance to this system is 19.32 light-years (5.92 parsecs). The two components are designated Eta Cassiopeiae A (officially named Achird) and B.

== Nomenclature ==
η Cassiopeiae (Latinised to Eta Cassiopeiae) is the system's Bayer designation. The designations of the two constituents as Eta Cassiopeiae A and B derive from the convention used by the Washington Multiplicity Catalog (WMC) for star systems, and adopted by the International Astronomical Union (IAU).

The proper name Achird was apparently first applied to Eta Cassiopeiae in the Skalnate Pleso Atlas of the Heavens published in 1950, but is not known prior to that. Richard Hinckley Allen gives no historical names for the star in his book Star Names: Their Lore and Meaning. In 2016, the IAU organized a Working Group on Star Names (WGSN) to catalog and standardize proper names for stars. The WGSN decided to attribute proper names to individual stars rather than entire multiple systems. It approved the name Achird for the component Eta Cassiopeiae A on 5 September 2017 and it is now so included in the List of IAU-approved Star Names.

In Chinese astronomy, Eta Cassiopeiae is within the Legs mansion, and is part of the 王良 (Wáng Liáng) asterism named for a famous charioteer during the Spring and Autumn period. The other components are Beta Cassiopeiae (Caph), Kappa Cassiopeiae, Alpha Cassiopeiae (Schedar) and Lambda Cassiopeiae. Consequently, the Chinese name for Eta Cassiopeiae itself is 王良三 (Wáng Liáng sān, English: the Third Star of Wang Liang).

== Properties ==
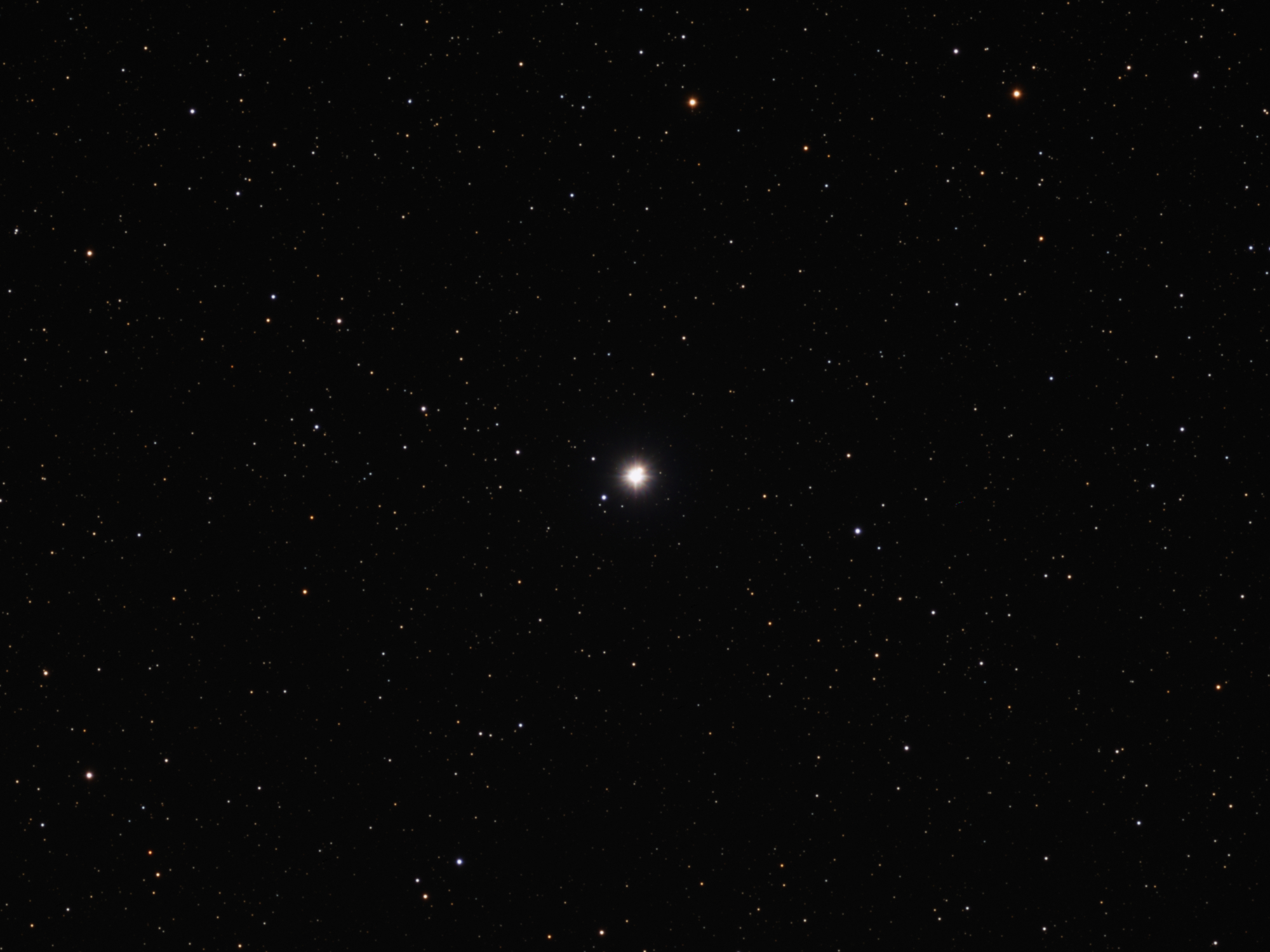
η Cas in optical light

Eta Cassiopeiae's two components are orbiting around each other over a period of 472 years. The two stars are separated by an average distance of 70.55 AU, where an AU is the average distance between the Sun and the Earth. However, the large orbital eccentricity of 0.4916 means that their periapsis, or closest approach, is as small as 35 AU, with an apoapsis of about 105 AU. For comparison, the semi-major axis of Neptune is 30 AU.

There are six dimmer optical components listed in the Washington Double Star Catalog. However, none of them are related to the Eta Cassiopeiae system and are in reality more distant stars. The primary has been reported to be a spectroscopic binary, but this has never been confirmed.

Eta Cassiopeiae A has an apparent magnitude of 3.44. It has a stellar classification of G0 V, which makes it a G-type main-sequence star like the Sun. It therefore resembles what the Sun might look like were humans to observe it from Eta Cassiopeiae. The star has 103% of the mass and 104% the radius of the Sun. It radiates 113% of the luminosity of the Sun from its photosphere at an effective temperature of 5,879 K. It appears to be rotating at a leisurely rate, with a projected rotational velocity of 3.15 km s^{−1}.

The cooler and dimmer (magnitude 7.51) Eta Cassiopeiae B is of stellar classification K7 V; a K-type main-sequence star. It has only 57% of the mass and radius of the Sun. This star radiates only 8% of the luminosity of the Sun from its photosphere at an effective temperature of 4,011 K.

Compared to the Sun, both components show only half the abundance of elements other than hydrogen and helium—what astronomers term their metallicity.

A necessary condition for the existence of a planet in this system are stable zones where the object can remain in orbit for long intervals. For hypothetical planets in a circular orbit around the individual members of this star system, this maximum orbital radius is computed to be 9.5 AU for the primary and 7.1 AU for the secondary. (Note that the orbit of Mars is 1.5 AU from the Sun.) A planet orbiting outside of both stars would need to be at least 235 AU distant.

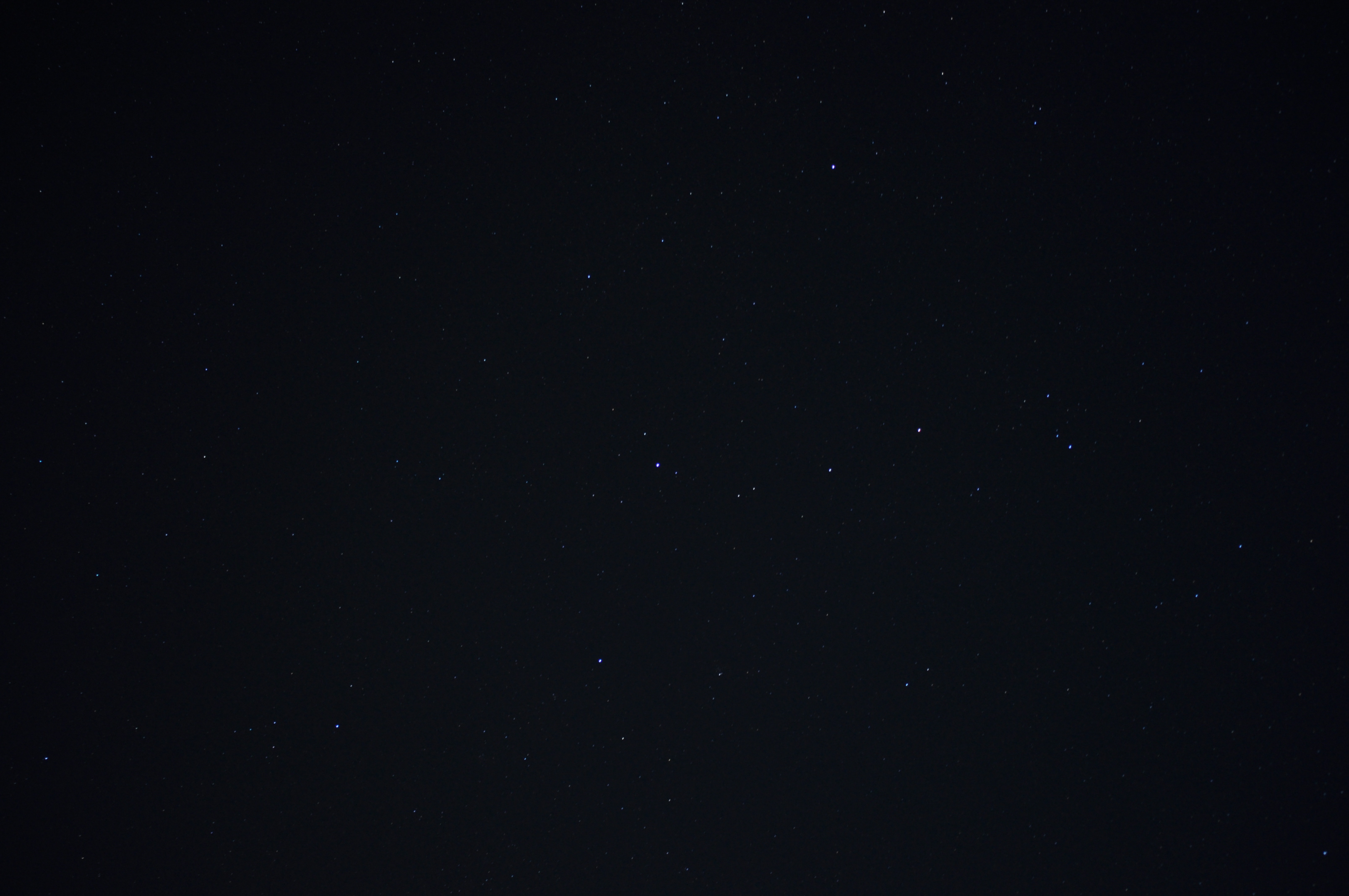
Cassiopeia constellation

Eta Cassiopeiae

== Possible planetary system ==
Eta Cassiopeiae A shows a peridiocity of 868 days (2.38 years) on its radial velocity, which is not correlated to any known stellar activity cycles. This periodicity could be explained by an exoplanet with a mass of at least 22 M_{🜨}. Future research is needed to confirm this putative planet, eliminating the possibility of a long-term activity cycle.

Another study in 2025, using additional radial velocity data, also detected a similar period of 841 days, but this periodicity has a significant possibility of being a false positive detection. No other significant periodicites were detected, ruling out the presence of any giant planet orbiting the primary star.

The Achird planetary system
Companion (in order from star)	Mass	Semimajor axis (AU)	Orbital period (days)	Eccentricity	Inclination (°)	Radius
b (unconfirmed)	≥22 M_{🜨}	—	868	—	—	—

== See also ==
- Lists of stars
- List of stars in Cassiopeia
- List of nearest G-type stars
- List of nearest K-type stars
