= Gamma Cassiopeiae =

Star system in the constellation Cassiopeia

γ Cassiopeiae
- Location of γ Cassiopeiae (circled)

Observation data Epoch J2000 Equinox ICRS
- Constellation: Cassiopeia
- Right ascension: 00^{h} 56^{m} 42.50108^{s}
- Declination: +60° 43′ 00.2984″
- Apparent magnitude (V): 2.39 (varies by±0.01)

Characteristics
- Evolutionary stage: main sequence
- Spectral type: B0.5IVe
- U−B color index: −1.08
- B−V color index: −0.15
- Variable type: γ Cas

Astrometry
Radial velocity (R_{v})	−6.8 km/s
Proper motion (μ)	RA: +25.17 mas/yr Dec.: −3.92 mas/yr
Parallax (π)	5.94±0.12 mas
Distance	550 ± 10 ly (168 ± 3 pc)
Absolute magnitude (M_{V})	−3.98

Orbit
Primary	Aa
Name	Ab
Period (P)	203.523±0.076 d
Semi-major axis (a)	1.632+0.002 −0.001 AU
Eccentricity (e)	0
Inclination (i)	45°
Semi-amplitude (K_{1}) (primary)	4.297±0.090 km/s

Orbit
Primary	Aab
Name	B
Period (P)	60.0 yr
Semi-major axis (a)	0.233″

Orbit
Primary	A
Name	B
Semi-major axis (a)	2.054″

Details

Aa
Mass	15±2 M_{☉}
Radius	10.9+0.8 −0.6 (equatorial); 7.9±0.4 (polar) R_{☉}
Luminosity	19,000±500 L_{☉}
Surface gravity (log g)	3.50 cgs
Temperature	26,500 (polar); 17,300 (equatorial) K
Rotational velocity (v sin i)	389±20 km/s
Age	8.0±0.4 Myr

Ab
Mass	0.93+0.04 −0.01 M_{☉}
Radius	6,000+65 −320 km

B
Mass	1.02 M_{☉}

Other designations
- Tiansi, Tsih, Navi, γ Cas, 27 Cassiopeiae, AAVSO 0050+60, BD+59°144, FK5 32, HD 5394, HIP 4427, HR 264, SAO 11482, ADS 782, CCDM J00567+6043, WDS J00567+6043
- γ Cas A: ADS 782 A, CCDM J00567+6043 A, WDS J00567+6043A
- γ Cas B: ADS 782 B, CCDM J00567+6043 B, WDS J00567+6043B

Database references
SIMBAD	data

Gamma Cassiopeiae, also named Tiansi, is a multiple star system at the center of the distinctive "W" asterism in the northern circumpolar constellation of Cassiopeia. It was observed in 1866 by Angelo Secchi, the first star ever observed with emission lines. It is now considered a Be star.

Gamma Cassiopeiae is a variable star system. Based upon parallax measurements made by the Hipparcos satellite, it is located at a distance of roughly 550 light-years from Earth. Together with its common-proper-motion companion, HD 5408, the system could contain a total of eight stars. It is one of the highest multiplicity systems known.

== Names ==
γ Cassiopeiae (Latinized to Gamma Cassiopeiae, abbreviated Gamma Cas or γ Cas) is the object's Bayer designation, and it has the Flamsteed designation 27 Cassiopeiae. Although it is a fairly bright star with a combined apparent visual magnitude of 2.47, it had no traditional Arabic or Latin name.

The Chinese name Tsih, "the whip" (Chinese: 策; pinyin: Cè), is commonly associated with this star. The name however originally referred to κ Cassiopeiae, and γ Cassiopeiae was just one of four horses (Chinese: 天駟; pinyin: Tiān Sì; "Heavenly Quadriga") pulling the chariot of legendary charioteer Wangliang (see β Cassiopeiae). This representation was later changed to make Gamma the whip. The IAU Working Group on Star Names approved the name Tiansi for γ Cassiopeiae Aa on 13 November 2025, after the older Chinese name, and it is now so entered in the IAU Catalog of Star Names.

The star was used as an easily identifiable navigational reference point during the Apollo program, and was given the name Navi ("Ivan" backwards) in 1967 in honor of Apollo 1 astronaut Virgil Ivan "Gus" Grissom, by the Apollo 9 crew and Dr. Clarence Cleminshaw of the Griffith Observatory (it was not named by Grissom himself, as is often claimed).

== Physical properties ==
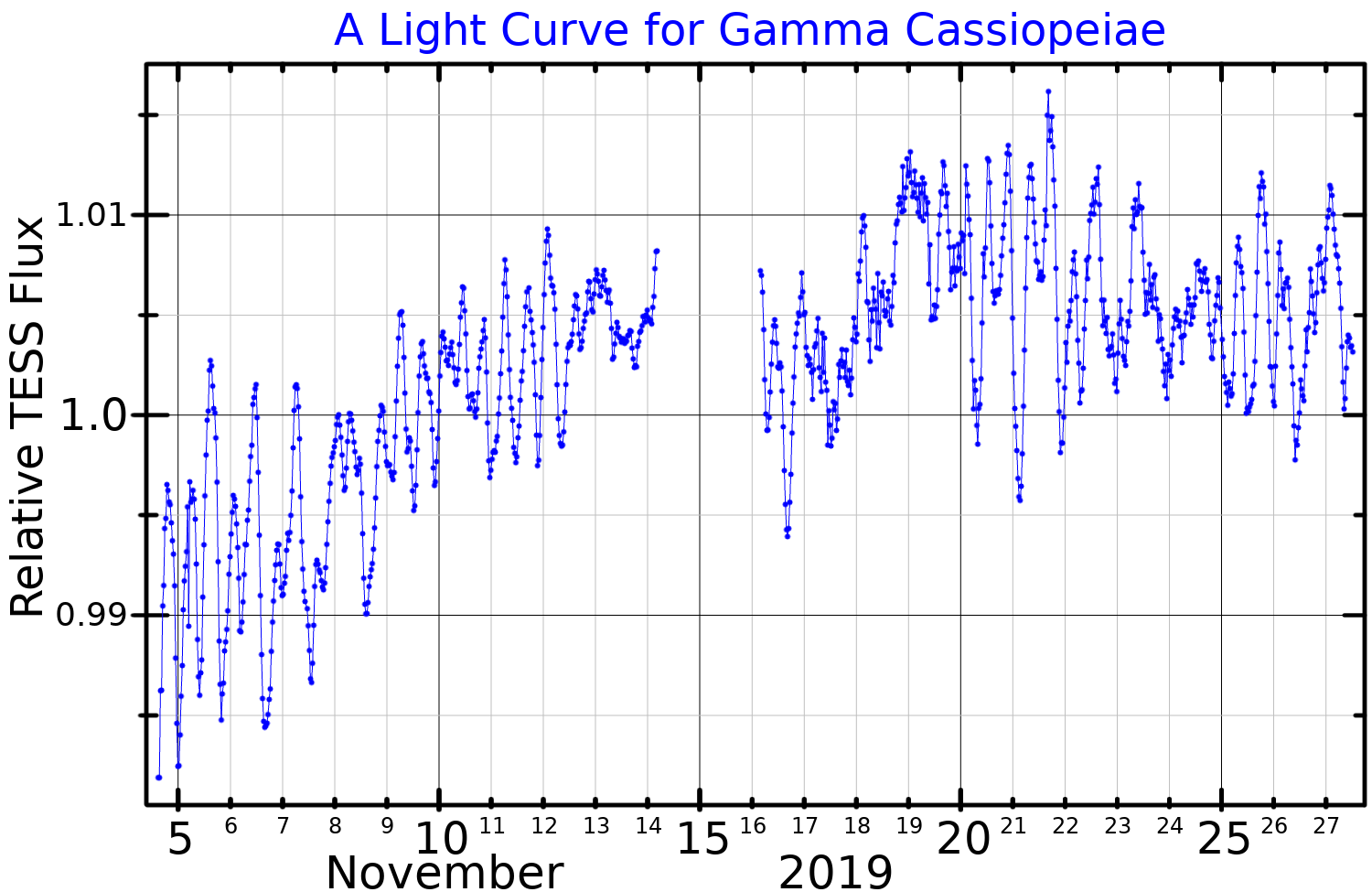
A light curve for Gamma Cassiopeiae, plotted from data published by Labadie-Bartz et al. (2021)

Gamma Cassiopeiae is an eruptive variable star. It is the prototype of the class of Gamma Cassiopeiae variable stars. In the late 1930s it underwent what is described as a shell episode and the brightness increased to above magnitude 2.0, then dropped rapidly to 3.4. At maximum intensity, γ Cassiopeiae outshined both Alpha Cassiopeiae (Schedar; magnitude 2.25) and Beta Cassiopeiae (Caph; 2.3). It has since been gradually brightening back to around 2.2. Observations by the TESS satellite in November 2019 showed amplitudes of no more than 2%.

Gamma Cassiopeiae is a rapidly spinning star with a projected rotational velocity of 389 km/s, giving it a pronounced equatorial bulge. When accounted for its axial inclination, the true value is found to be 450±20 km/s. The equatorial radius is 10.9 R_{☉} and the polar radius is 7.9 R_{☉}. When combined with the star's high luminosity, the result is the ejection of matter that forms a hot circumstellar disk of gas. The emissions and brightness variations are apparently caused by this "decretion disk".

The spectrum of this massive star matches a stellar classification of B0.5 IVe. The 'e' suffix is used for stars that show emission lines of hydrogen in the spectrum, caused in this case by the circumstellar disk. This places it among a category known as Be stars; in fact, the first such star ever to be so designated. A luminosity class of IV suggest it is a subgiant star that has reached a stage of its evolution where it is exhausting the supply of hydrogen in its core region and transforming into a giant star, although it is modelled to be only about a third of the way through its main-sequence life after a relatively brief 8 million years. The outer atmosphere has an intense effective temperature of 25,000 K, which is causing it to glow with a blue-white hue. It has 17 times the Sun's mass and is radiating as much energy as 19,000 Suns.

Gamma Cassiopeiae exhibits characteristics consistent with a strong disordered magnetic field. No field can be measured directly from the Zeeman effect because of the star's rotation-broadened spectral lines. Instead, the presence of this field is inferred from a robust periodic signal of 1.21 days that suggests a magnetic field rooted on the rotating star's surface. The star's UV and optical spectral lines show ripples moving from blue to red over several hours, which indicates clouds of matter being held frozen over the star's surface by strong magnetic fields. This evidence suggests that a magnetic field from the star is interacting with the decretion disk, resulting in the X-ray emission. A disk dynamo has been advanced as a mechanism to explain this modulation of the X-rays. However, difficulties remain with this mechanism, among which is that there are no disk dynamos known to exist in other stars, rendering this behavior more difficult to analyze.

=== X-ray emission ===
Gamma Cassiopeiae is the prototype of a small group of stellar sources of X-ray radiation that is at least 10 times stronger than emitted from other B or Be stars. The character of the X-ray spectrum is thermal, i.e. it is emitted from hot plasmas with temperatures higher than 60 million kelvins (5keV). It also shows very short-term, middle-term and long-term variations. Historically, it has been proposed that these X-rays might arise from magnetic interactions between the star and its disk, from a collision between the disk and the wind from a hot stripped-star companion, or from accretion onto the surface of a degenerate companion such as a white dwarf or neutron star.

Observations are incompatible with the wind-disk collision and accretion on a neutron star. In 2026, high-resolution data obtained with XRISM revealed that the signatures of the hot plasma followed the companion's motion, validating the scenario with accretion on a white dwarf.

== Companions ==
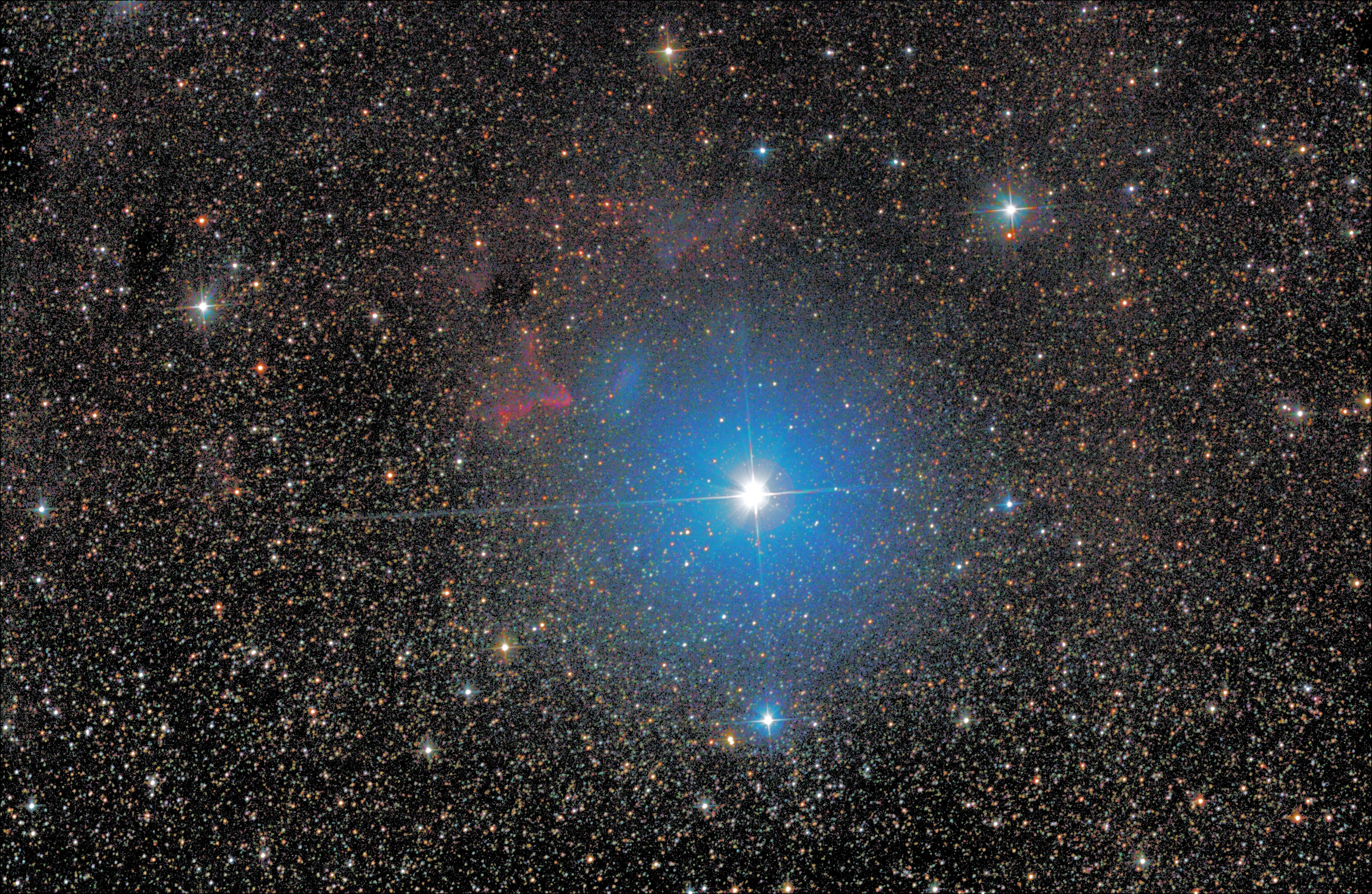
Amateur image of γ Cassiopeiae and the associated nebulae IC63 and IC59. The bright star due south of Gamma Cassiopeiae is HD 5408, a common proper motion companion. (Neil Michael Wyatt)

Gamma Cassiopeiae has three visible companions, listed in double star catalogues as components B, C, and D. Star B is about 2 arc-seconds distant and magnitude 11, and has a similar space velocity to the bright primary, making it likely to be physically associated. An orbit would take over a thousand years. Component C is magnitude 13, nearly an arc-minute distant, and is listed in Gaia Data Release 3 as having a very different proper motion and being much more distant than Gamma Cassiopeiae. Finally, component D, about 21 arc-minutes distant, is the naked-eye star HR 266 (HD 5408), itself a quadruple system and thought to be associated although separated by about a parsec.

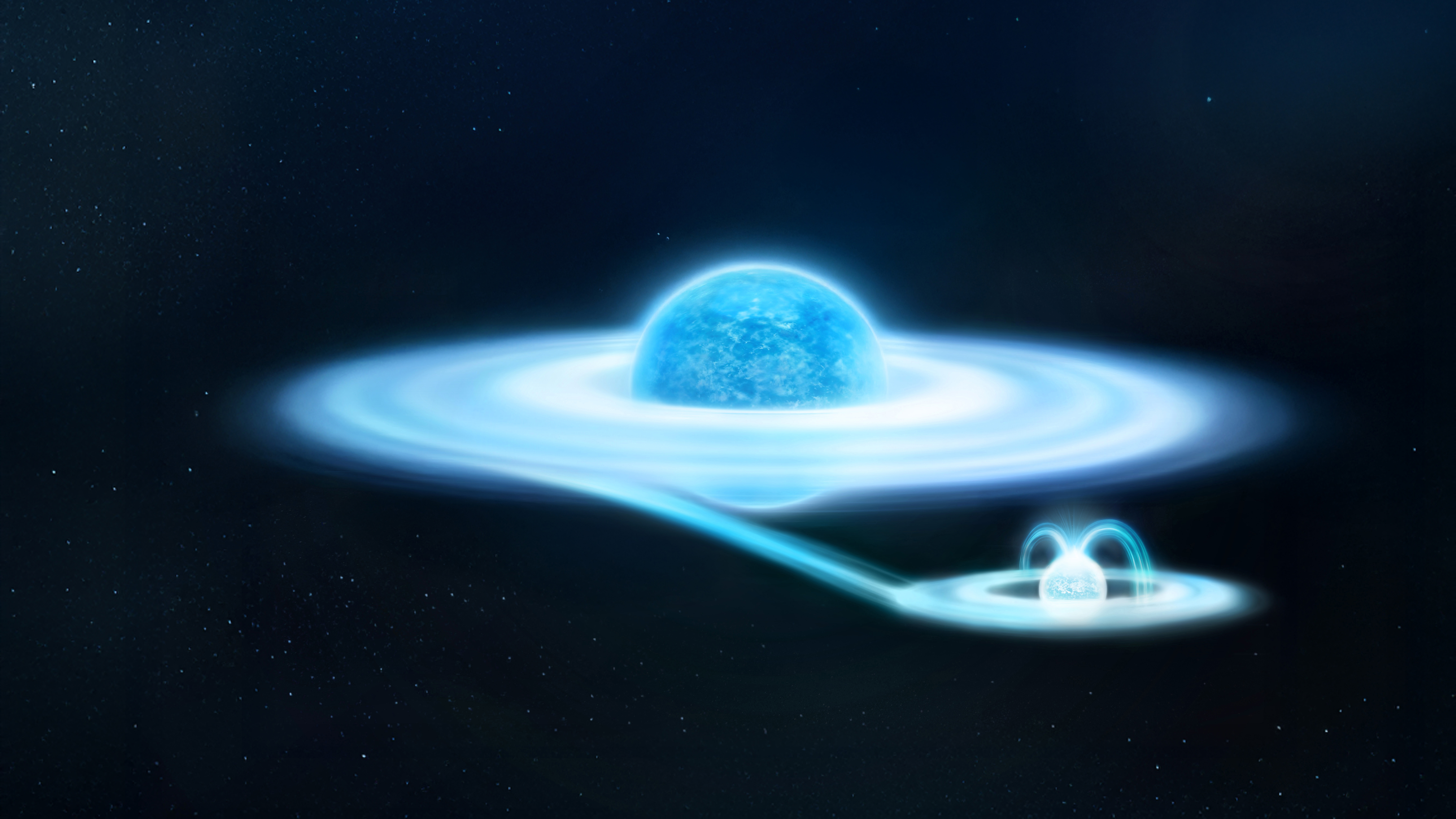
Artistic representation of Gamma Cassiopeiae system

Gamma Cassiopeiae A, the bright primary, is itself a spectroscopic binary with an orbital period of about 203.5 days and an eccentricity near zero. The companion is a white dwarf with a mass 0.93 times that of the Sun, and a size just smaller than Earth. It is likely to be more evolved than the primary and to have transferred mass to it during an earlier stage of evolution, although the primary is currently losing mass and the white dwarf is gaining mass though an accretion disk. Additionally, Hipparcos data show a "wobble" with an amplitude of about 150 mas, that may correspond to the orbit of a third star. This star would have an orbital period of at least 60 years.

== See also ==
- Iota Ursae Majoris, informally named Dnoces for astronaut Ed White
- Gamma Velorum, informally named Regor for astronaut Roger B. Chaffee
- Sh 2-185, an H II region centered on Gamma Cassiopeiae
