= Beta Cassiopeiae =

Second-brightest star in the constellation Cassiopeia

Caph, Beta Cassiopeiae
- Location of β Cassiopeiae (circled)

Observation data Epoch J2000 Equinox ICRS
- Constellation: Cassiopeia
- Right ascension: 00^{h} 09^{m} 10.68518^{s}
- Declination: +59° 08′ 59.2120″
- Apparent magnitude (V): +2.28 (2.25–2.31)

Characteristics
- Spectral type: F2 III
- U−B color index: 0.11
- B−V color index: 0.34
- Variable type: δ Sct

Astrometry
Radial velocity (R_{v})	11.3 km/s
Proper motion (μ)	RA: +523.50 mas/yr Dec.: −179.77 mas/yr
Parallax (π)	59.58±0.38 mas
Distance	54.7 ± 0.3 ly (16.8 ± 0.1 pc)
Absolute magnitude (M_{V})	+1.3

Details
Mass	1.91±0.02 M_{☉}
Radius	3.79+0.10 −0.09 (equatorial); 3.06+0.08 −0.07 (polar) R_{☉}
Luminosity	21.3+1.0 −0.7 L_{☉}
Surface gravity (log g)	3.40 cgs
Temperature	6,167 (equatorial); 7,208 (polar) K
Metallicity [Fe/H]	0.03 dex
Rotation	0.893 d
Rotational velocity (v sin i)	72.4+1.5 −3.5 km/s
Age	1.18±0.05 Gyr

Other designations
- Caph, Chaph, Kaff, Al Sanam al Nakah, 11 Cas, BD+58°3, FK5 2, GC 147, HD 432, HIP 746, HR 21, SAO 21133, ADS 107, CCDM J00092+5909, LHS 1027

Database references
SIMBAD	data

Beta Cassiopeiae is a Delta Scuti variable star in the constellation of Cassiopeia. It has the proper name Caph, pronounced /ˈkæf/; Beta Cassiopeiae is its Bayer designation, which is Latinized from β Cassiopeiae and abbreviated Beta Cas or β Cas. This is a giant star belonging to the spectral class F2. This white star of second magnitude (+2.28 mag, variable) has an absolute magnitude of +1.3 mag.

== Nomenclature ==
Beta Cassiopeiae is the star's Bayer designation. It also bore the traditional names Caph (from the Arabic word كف kaf, "palm" – i.e. reaching from the Pleiades), Chaph and Kaff, as well as al-Sanam al-Nakah "the Camel's Hump". In 2016, the International Astronomical Union organized a Working Group on Star Names (WGSN) to catalog and standardize proper names for stars. The WGSN's first bulletin of July 2016 included a table of the first two batches of names approved by the WGSN; which included Caph for this star.

Originally, the pre-Islamic Arabic term al-Kaff al-Khadib "the stained hand" referred to the five stars comprising the 'W' of the constellation Cassiopeia, and depicted a hand stained with henna. The term was abbreviated and somehow came to signify β Cassiopeiae alone. The old "stained hand" was part of an asterism called Thuraya stretching from the Pleiades, which signified the "head" through Taurus and Perseus and into Cassiopeia, while the other "hand" was in Cetus.

In Chinese astronomy, β Cassiopeiae is part of the asterism Wáng Liáng (王良), representing a legendary charioteer from the Spring and Autumn period. β Cassiopeiae represents Wang Liang himself, while the other four stars of the asterism represent his four horses (Tiān Sì, 天駟). (Note: These four stars were originally γ Cassiopeiae, η Cassiopeiae, α Cassiopeiae and ζ Cassiopeiae, but were later identified as κ Cassiopeiae, η Cassiopeiae, α Cassiopeiae and λ Cassiopeiae.) Consequently, the Chinese name for β Cassiopeiae itself is Wáng Liáng yī (王良一, English: the First Star of Wang Liang), or simply Wáng Liáng.

Together with Alpha Andromedae (Alpheratz) and Gamma Pegasi (Algenib), Beta Cassiopeiae was one of three bright stars known as the "Three Guides" marking the equinoctial colure. This is an imaginary line running due south from Beta Cassiopeiae through Alpha Andromedae to the celestial equator, at a point where the Sun's path (the ecliptic) crosses it each autumn and spring equinox.

== Visibility ==
With a mean apparent magnitude (V-band) of +2.28, it is one of the five stars which make up the 'W' of Cassiopeia, adjacent to the just brighter Schedar (Alpha Cassiopeiae). SN 1572, traditionally known as Tycho's Star, appeared about 5 degrees to the northwest of Caph in 1572.

As a star in the deep northern hemisphere of the sky, Beta Cassiopeiae is prominent to viewers in the northern hemisphere but not often seen by those in the southern hemisphere. The constellation of Cassiopeia does not rise above the horizon to viewers in Tasmania, and only low if one were in Cairns.

== System ==
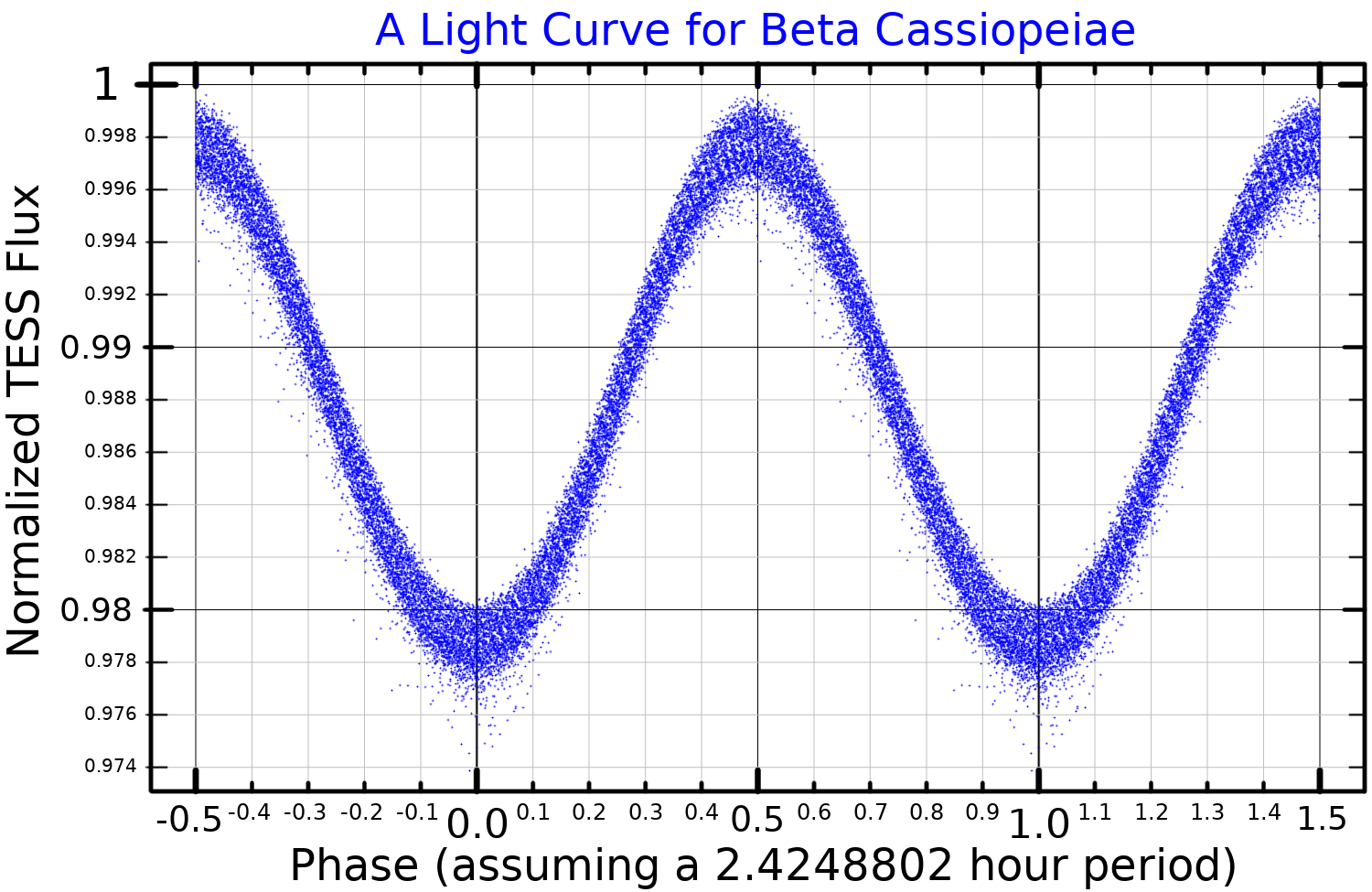
A light curve for Beta Cassiopeiae, plotted from TESS data

Beta Cassiopeiae is a yellow-white hued giant of stellar class F2 III. More than three times the size of and 21 times brighter than the Sun, Caph has an absolute magnitude of +1.3. It was once an A-type star with about double the Sun's mass. It is now in the process of cooling and expanding to become a red giant. Its core is likely to have used up its hydrogen and is shrinking and heating, while its outer envelope of hydrogen is expanding and cooling. Stars do not spend much time in this state and are relatively uncommon. Caph's corona is unusually weak.

Beta Cassiopeiae is a variable star of the Delta Scuti type; in fact, the fourth brightest of such stars in the sky after Denebola, Vega and Altair. It is a monoperiodic pulsator, with a brightness that ranges from magnitude +2.25 to +2.31 with a period of 2.5 hours. This type of variable includes subgiant or main-sequence stars of spectral classes F5–A0, having masses between 1.5 and 2.5 solar masses and nearing the end of their core hydrogen fusion lifetime. Their pulsations are related to the same helium instability strip on the Hertzsprung–Russell diagram as that of classical Cepheids. Delta Scuti stars are located at the intersection of the strip with the main sequence.

This star is rotating at about 92% of its critical velocity, completing 1.12 rotations every day. This is giving the star an oblate spheroid shape with an equatorial bulge that is 24% larger than the polar radius. This shape is causing the polar region to have a higher temperature than the equator: the temperature difference is about 1,000 K. The star is being viewed nearly pole-on, the stellar axis is inclined about 20 degrees to the line of sight from the Earth.

Beta Cassiopeiae was once considered to be a spectroscopic binary with a faint companion in a 27-day orbit, but it is now thought to be a single star.
