= Vista paradox =

Optical Illusion seen through windows

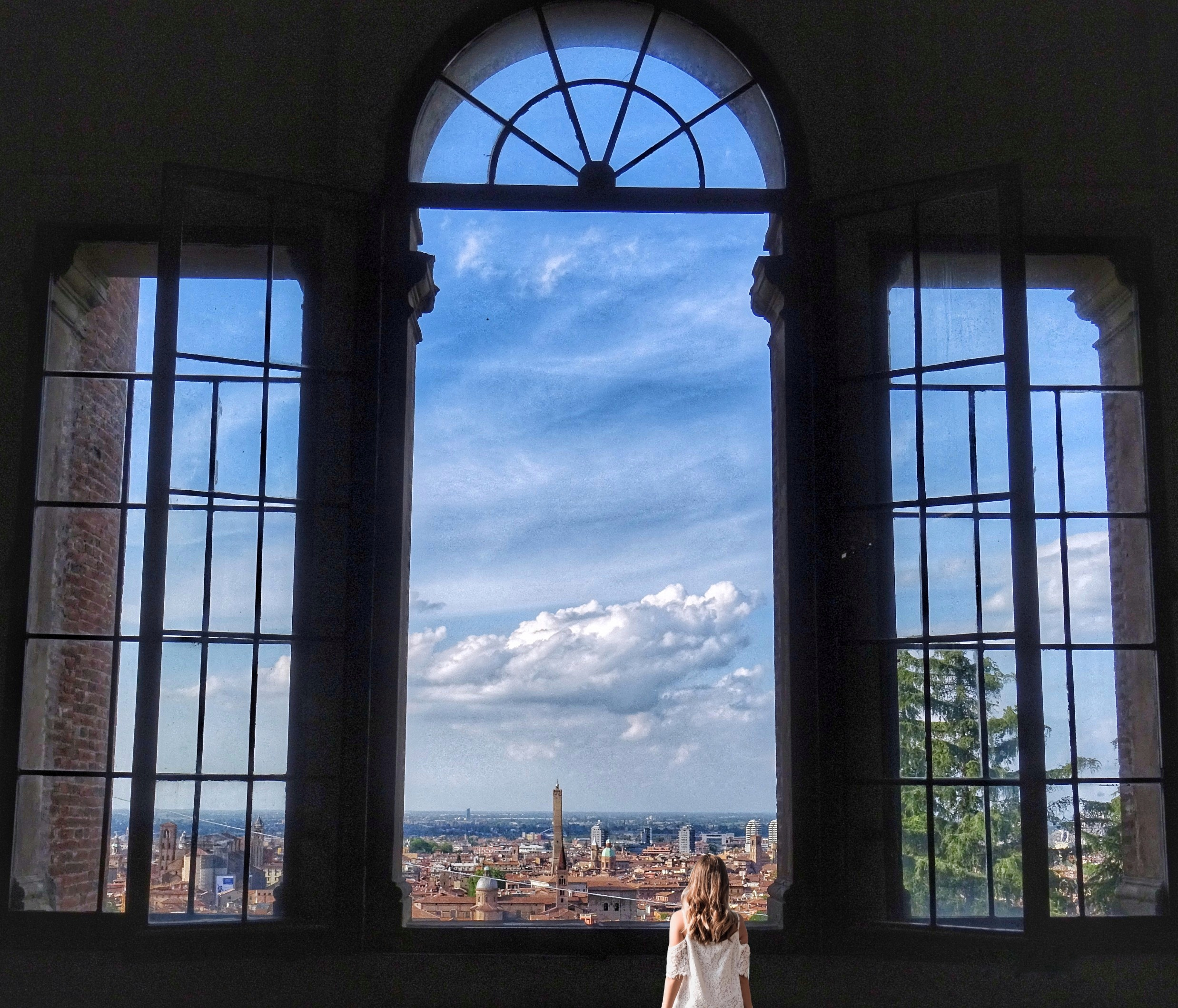
The Asinelli Tower seen from the long corridor of San Michele in Bosco in Bologna, Italy. When an observer stands very near to the window at one end of the corridor the tower seems very small, while when they stand on the other end further away from the window the tower appears paradoxically enlarged.

The Vista paradox, sometimes colloquially referred to as the Sydney Opera House illusion after a video from digital content creator Vsauce, is a natural optical illusion where an object seen through an aperture (such as a window) appears to shrink in apparent size as the observer approaches the aperture. The paradox takes place when the distant object that seems to be shrinking or enlarging as its visual angle respectively increases or decreases is many times further away than the maximum distance between the observer and the aperture.

== See also ==
- Depth perception
- Forced perspective
- Perceived visual angle
- Perspective distortion (photography)
