= HD 5408 =

Quadruple star system in the constellation Cassiopeia

- Location of HD 5408 (circled)

Observation data Epoch J2000 Equinox ICRS
- Constellation: Cassiopeia
- AB
- Right ascension: 00^{h} 56^{m} 46.972^{s}
- Declination: +60° 21′ 46.22″
- Apparent magnitude (V): 5.57

Characteristics

Aa
- Spectral type: B7V

Ab1
- Spectral type: B9IV or B9V

Ab2
- Spectral type: A7V

AB
- Spectral type: B7V

UCAC4 752-011208
- Spectral type: M4Ve

Astrometry
Radial velocity (R_{v})	−8.70±0.2 km/s
Proper motion (μ)	RA: +26.13 mas/yr Dec.: −3.79 mas/yr
Parallax (π)	6.06±0.41 mas
Distance	540 ± 40 ly (170 ± 10 pc)
Absolute magnitude (M_{V})	−0.52

Orbit
Primary	AB
Name	UCAC4 752-011208
Semi-major axis (a)	62.21″

Orbit
Primary	A
Name	B
Period (P)	84.10±0.84 yr
Semi-major axis (a)	0.237±0.006″
Eccentricity (e)	0.225±0.010
Inclination (i)	53.6±0.9°
Longitude of the node (Ω)	171.5±0.9°
Periastron epoch (T)	1953.59±0.83
Argument of periastron (ω) (secondary)	343.5±3.6°
Semi-amplitude (K_{1}) (primary)	4.30 km/s

Orbit
Primary	Aa
Name	Ab
Period (P)	4.899±0.038 yr
Semi-major axis (a)	0.0309±0.0012″
Eccentricity (e)	0.260±0.017
Inclination (i)	47.3±3.2°
Longitude of the node (Ω)	146.8±2.5°
Periastron epoch (T)	2003.565±0.038
Argument of periastron (ω) (secondary)	279.2±2.9°
Semi-amplitude (K_{1}) (primary)	11.18±0.24 km/s

Orbit
Primary	Ab1
Name	Ab2
Period (P)	4.241146±0.000008 d
Eccentricity (e)	0.415±0.003
Inclination (i)	63°
Longitude of the node (Ω)	205.073±0.025°
Periastron epoch (T)	HJD 2445971.576±0.007
Argument of periastron (ω) (secondary)	72.8±0.6°
Semi-amplitude (K_{1}) (primary)	82.8±0.3 km/s
Semi-amplitude (K_{2}) (secondary)	123.7±1.0 km/s

Details

Aa
Mass	3.39 M_{☉}

Ab1
Mass	2.44 M_{☉}

Ab2
Mass	1.64 M_{☉}

B
Mass	3.39 M_{☉}
Age	360 Myr

UCAC4 752-011208
Mass	0.58 M_{☉}

Other designations
- AG+60°107, BD+59°146, GC 1120, HD 5408, HIP 4440, HR 266, SAO 11484, PPM 12601, ADS 784 AB, CCDM J00568+6022AB, WDS J00568+6022AB, TIC 51961599, 2MASS J00564697+6021463

Database references
SIMBAD	data

HD 5408 is a multiple star system in the northern constellation of Cassiopeia. It consists of a pair of stars only 237 mas apart, the primary consisting of three even closer stars, as well as an additional component located 60″ away. With a combined apparent magnitude of 5.57, it is faintly visible to the naked eye under dark skies, although it lies only 21′ from the 2nd-magnitude γ Cassiopeiae and may be bound to it. The system is located approximately 540 light-years (170 pc) distant according to parallax measurements by Hipparcos. It is trending closer towards the Solar System at a heliocentric radial velocity of −8.7 km/s.

== Designations ==
Its name, HD 5408, denotes that it is the 5,408th object in the Henry Draper Catalogue, included within the first volume published in 1918. Alternate designations include HR 266 and HIP 4440. It is listed multiple star catalogues as ADS 784, CCDM J00568+6022, and WDS J00568+6022. It is also catalogued as component D of γ Cassiopeiae, which lies at approximately the same distance and separated by about a parsec.

== Properties ==
The two resolved stars appear with apparent magnitudes 6.12 and 6.57 respectively. The secondary is a massive B9V star and orbits the triple system once every 83 years in a moderately eccentric orbit. The tertiary is a 16th magnitude M4Ve red dwarf.

The most massive of the inner stars, Aa orbits the other two, Ab1 and Ab2, once every four years in a moderately eccentric orbit. The inner pair complete a more eccentric orbit every four days. The orbits are approximately coplanar.

The masses of four of the stars have been determined from their orbital configuration, with Aa, Ab1, Ab2, and B having masses of 3.39 M_{☉}, 2.44 M_{☉}, 1.64 M_{☉}, and 3.39 M_{☉} respectively. The other properties, even the individual spectral types, are poorly known. Some assumptions constrained by the orbital masses lead to the spectral types of B7V, B9IV, A7V, and B7V for the four stars, although the eccentric inner pairing of a subgiant and main sequence star is unexpected as the orbit would be expected to become near-circular within the age of the stars. The spectral class of component Ab1 has alternatively been considered to be B9V, although the overall spectral class for the four stars is accepted as being B9IV.

A more distant companion star, UCAC4 752-011208, was found with Gaia data, although it was known to have a similar distance and proper motion since 2018. The system as a whole is thought to be part of the γ Cassiopeiae association, which contains over 140 stars within 6° of HD 5408 and γ Cas.

Multiple star catalogues report a faint star, component C, 21″ away, possibly itself a double, but the Gaia astrometry indicates that it is not related to HD 5408 and more likely is a background binary of two red dwarfs.

One of the system components is a mercury-manganese star, a chemically peculiar star with unusually strong spectral lines of mercury and manganese. These are usually slowly-rotating late B-type main sequence stars. A spectral type of B9V HgMn has been reported for the primary component of the innermost binary.

== Observational history ==
In 1899, astronomer Sherburne Wesley Burnham discovered that HD 5408 was a close double, the two stars being only 0.2″ apart.

Radial velocity variations were reported from HD 5408 by various observers, together with conflicting spectroscopic classifications, including a possible mercury-manganese star and a fast rotator. The anomalies were eventually resolved as indicating a hierarchical multiple system with an inner period of 4.2 days, an intermediate orbit of 1,769 days, and an outer orbit of about 84 years, but it was unclear which of the two visible stars was the multiple.

Further analysis of the motions of the visible stars, resolution of component A into two stars, and speckle interferometry of the system led to component A being considered to be a somewhat unusual triple system with the outer star being the most massive, but one of the inner stars possibly being more evolved. In this arrangement, components Aa and B were both equally massive and bright.

In 2024, an X-ray flare lasting over an hour was observed from close to the position of HD 5408, although it is not certain that it originated from this system.
