= NGC 436 =

Open cluster in the constellation Cassiopeia

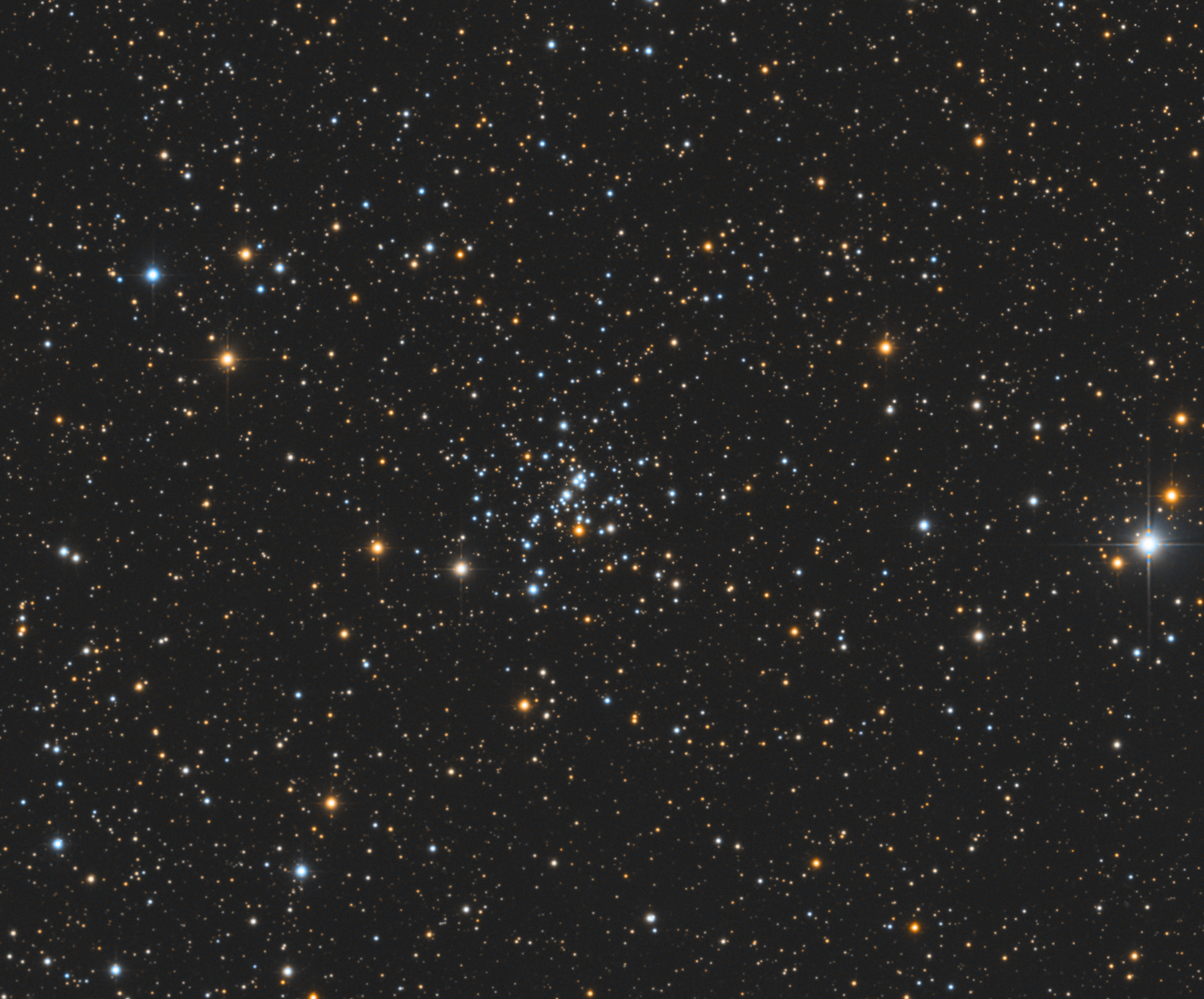
- Open cluster NGC 436 at the center

Observation data (J2000 epoch)
- Right ascension: 01^{h} 16^{m} 00.2^{s}
- Declination: +58° 49′ 12″
- Apparent magnitude (V): 8.8
- Apparent dimensions (V): 5′

Physical characteristics
- Other designations: Cr 11, C 0112+585, OCISM 72, OCl 320, [KPS2012] MWSC 0111.

Associations
- Constellation: Cassiopeia

NGC 436 is an open cluster of stars located in the northern constellation of Cassiopeia. It was discovered on November 3, 1787, by William Herschel. It was described by Dreyer as a "cluster, small, irregular figure, pretty compressed."
