= Kappa Cassiopeiae =

Star in the constellation Cassiopeia

κ Cassiopeiae
- Location of κ Cassiopeiae (circled)

Observation data Epoch J2000.0 Equinox ICRS
- Constellation: Cassiopeia
- Right ascension: 00^{h} 32^{m} 59.992^{s}
- Declination: +62° 55′ 54.41″
- Apparent magnitude (V): 4.12 to 4.21

Characteristics
- Spectral type: BC0.7 Ia
- Apparent magnitude (U): 3.50
- Apparent magnitude (B): 4.276
- Apparent magnitude (J): 4.141
- Apparent magnitude (H): 4.148
- Apparent magnitude (K): 4.013
- U−B color index: −0.776
- B−V color index: +0.0869
- J−H color index: −0.0069
- J−K color index: +0.128
- Variable type: α Cyg

Astrometry
Radial velocity (R_{v})	0.30 km/s
Proper motion (μ)	RA: +3.65 mas/yr Dec.: −2.07 mas/yr
Parallax (π)	0.73±0.17 mas
Distance	approx. 4,000 ly (approx. 1,400 pc)
Absolute magnitude (M_{V})	−7.1

Details
Mass	33 M_{☉}
Radius	39 R_{☉}
Luminosity	490,000 L_{☉}
Surface gravity (log g)	2.79 cgs
Temperature	24,600 K
Rotational velocity (v sin i)	58 km/s
Age	4.5 Myr

Other designations
- Cexing, κ Cas, 15 Cassiopeiae, BD+62°102, FK5 16, GC 645, HD 2905, HIP 2599, HR 130, SAO 11256

Database references
SIMBAD	data

Kappa Cassiopeiae, also named Cexing, is a star in the constellation Cassiopeia. Its name is a Bayer designation that is Latinized from κ Cassiopeiae, and abbreviated Kappa Cas or κ Cas. This is a variable star of 4th magnitude, indicating it is visible to the naked eye.

κ Cassiopeiae is assumed to be a member of the Cassiopeia OB14 stellar association (Cas OB14) and treated as being at a distance of about 1,100 pc, while its distance found from the Gaia parallax measurement is about 4,600 light-years (1,400 pc). A 2020 determination of the distance to Cas OB14 is 880 pc.

== Nomenclature ==
Kappa Cassiopeiae (Latinized from κ Cassiopeiae) is the star's Bayer designation.

In Chinese astronomy, κ Cassiopeiae is associated with the asterism Wáng Liáng (王良), representing a legendary charioteer from the Spring and Autumn period. It was originally identified as Cè (策), the charioteer's whip, but this name was later transferred to γ Cassiopeiae, with κ Cassiopeiae becoming one of the charioteer's four horses. The IAU Working Group on Star Names approved the name Cexing for κ Cassiopeiae on 13 November 2025 and it is now so entered in the IAU Catalog of Star Names; xing means star, and this form of the name was already used in ancient times.

== Properties ==
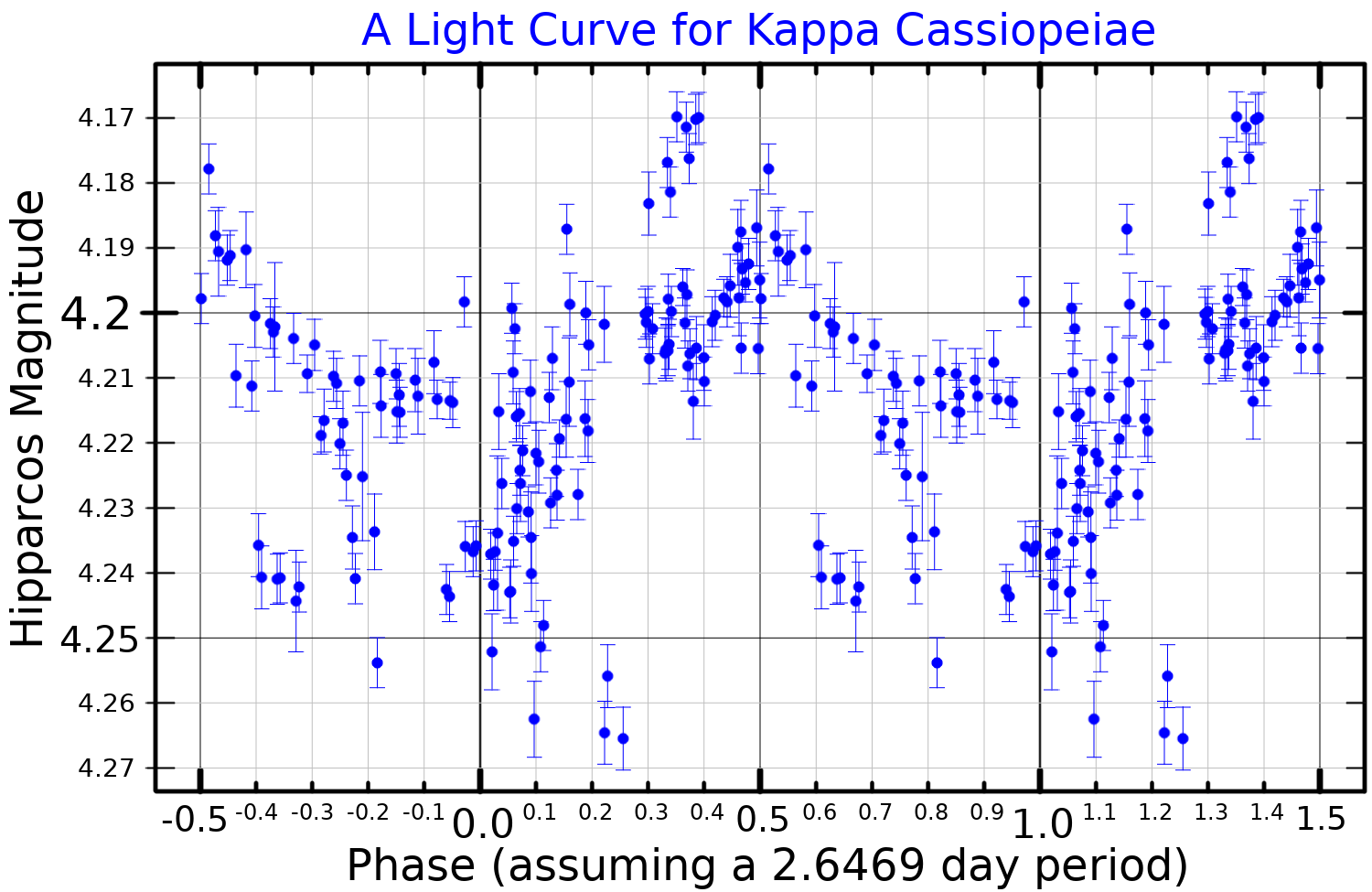
A light curve for Kappa Cassiopeiae, plotted from Hipparcos data

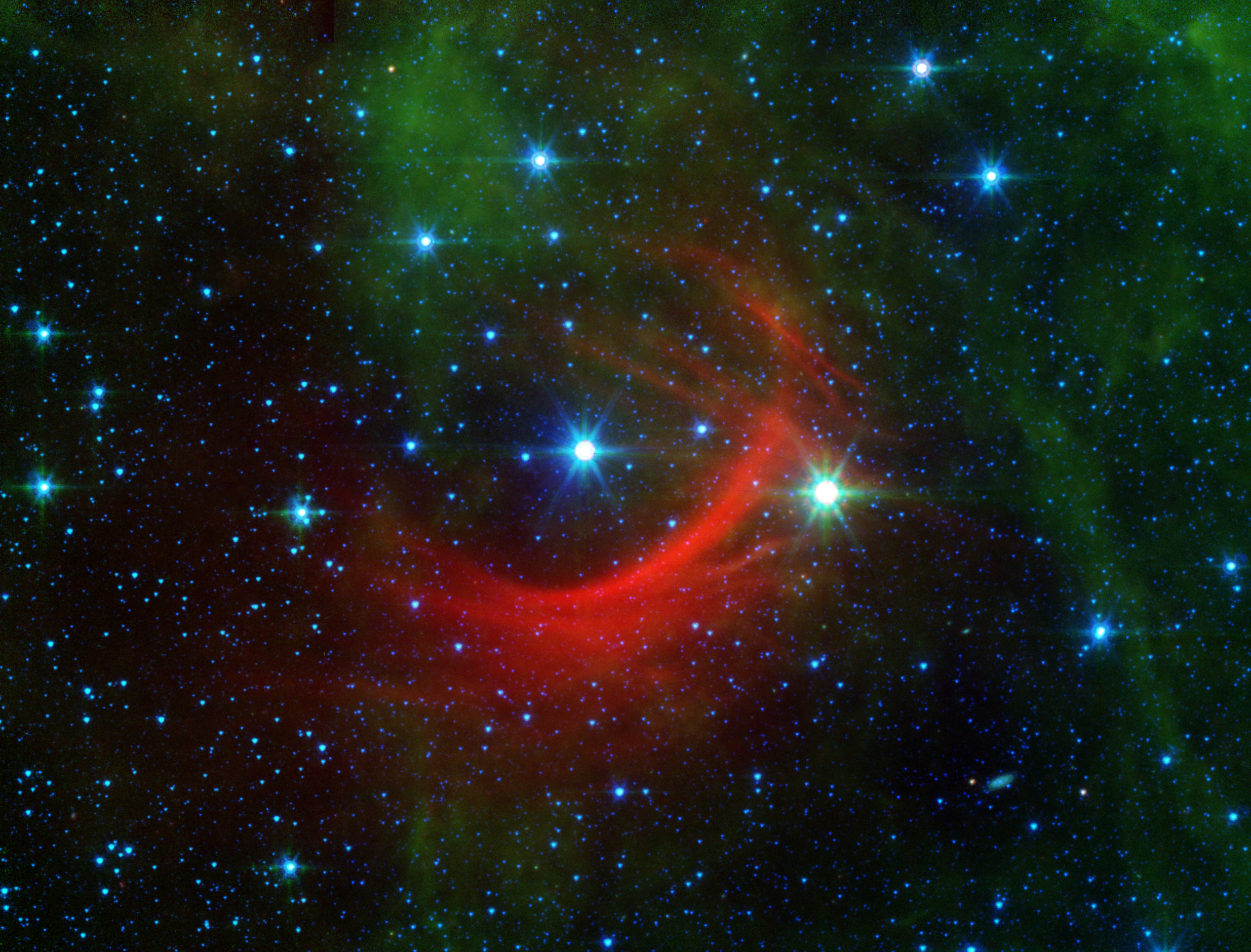
Kappa Cassiopeiae and its bow shock. Spitzer infrared image (NASA/JPL-Caltech)

κ Cassiopeiae has an unusual spectrum that has anomalously weak nitrogen lines, taken as an actual nitrogen deficiency in the atmosphere. This is indicated by the modified letter C on the assumption that it is also carbon-rich, although this might not actually be the case. It is also interpolated to BC0.7, being slightly hotter than a standard B1 star.

It is classified as an Alpha Cygni type variable star and its brightness varies by a few hundredths of a magnitude. Periods of two hours, 2.65 days, and nine days have been reported from observations at different times.

It is a runaway star. Its magnetic field and wind of particles creates a visible bow shock 4 light-years ahead of it, colliding with the diffuse, and usually invisible, interstellar gas and dust. This is about the same distance that Earth is from Proxima Centauri, the nearest star to the Sun. The dimensions of the bow shock are vast: around 12 light-years long and 1.8 light-years wide.
