= Lambda Cassiopeiae =

Star system in Cassiopeia

λ Cassiopeiae
- Location of λ Cassiopeiae (circled)

Observation data Epoch J2000.0 Equinox ICRS
- Constellation: Cassiopeia
- Right ascension: 00^{h} 31^{m} 46.35935^{s}
- Declination: +54° 31′ 20.2257″
- Apparent magnitude (V): 4.772 (5.33 / 5.62)

Characteristics
- Spectral type: B8 Vnn
- U−B color index: −0.35
- B−V color index: −0.10

Astrometry
Radial velocity (R_{v})	−12.20±1.3 km/s
Proper motion (μ)	RA: +41.20±0.29 mas/yr Dec.: −16.54±0.35 mas/yr
Parallax (π)	8.64±0.43 mas
Distance	380 ± 20 ly (116 ± 6 pc)
Absolute magnitude (M_{V})	−0.57

Orbit
Period (P)	245.70±35.96 yr
Semi-major axis (a)	0.448±0.028″
Eccentricity (e)	0.689±0.119
Inclination (i)	53.6±5.2°
Longitude of the node (Ω)	17.6±9.6°
Periastron epoch (T)	2025.54±4.56
Argument of periastron (ω) (secondary)	301.0±2.6°

Details

λ Cas A
Mass	2.9+0.45 −0.40 M_{☉}
Radius	3.50 R_{☉}
Luminosity	255 L_{☉}
Surface gravity (log g)	4.0±0.25 cgs
Temperature	12,000±1,000 K
Rotational velocity (v sin i)	253 km/s
Age	58+104 −48 Myr

Other designations
- λ Cas, 14 Cassiopeiae, BD+53°82, HD 2772, HIP 2505, HR 123, SAO 21489, ADS 434, CCDM J00318+5431, WDS J00318+5431AB

Database references
SIMBAD	λ Cas
- λ Cas A
- λ Cas B

Lambda Cassiopeiae is a binary star system in the northern constellation of Cassiopeia. Its name is a Bayer designation that is Latinized from λ Cassiopeiae, and abbreviated Lambda Cas or λ Cas. The system has a combined apparent magnitude of +4.74, making it faintly visible to the naked eye. With an annual parallax shift of 8.64 mas, it is approximately 380 light years from Earth. The system is moving closer to the Sun with a radial velocity of −12 km/s.

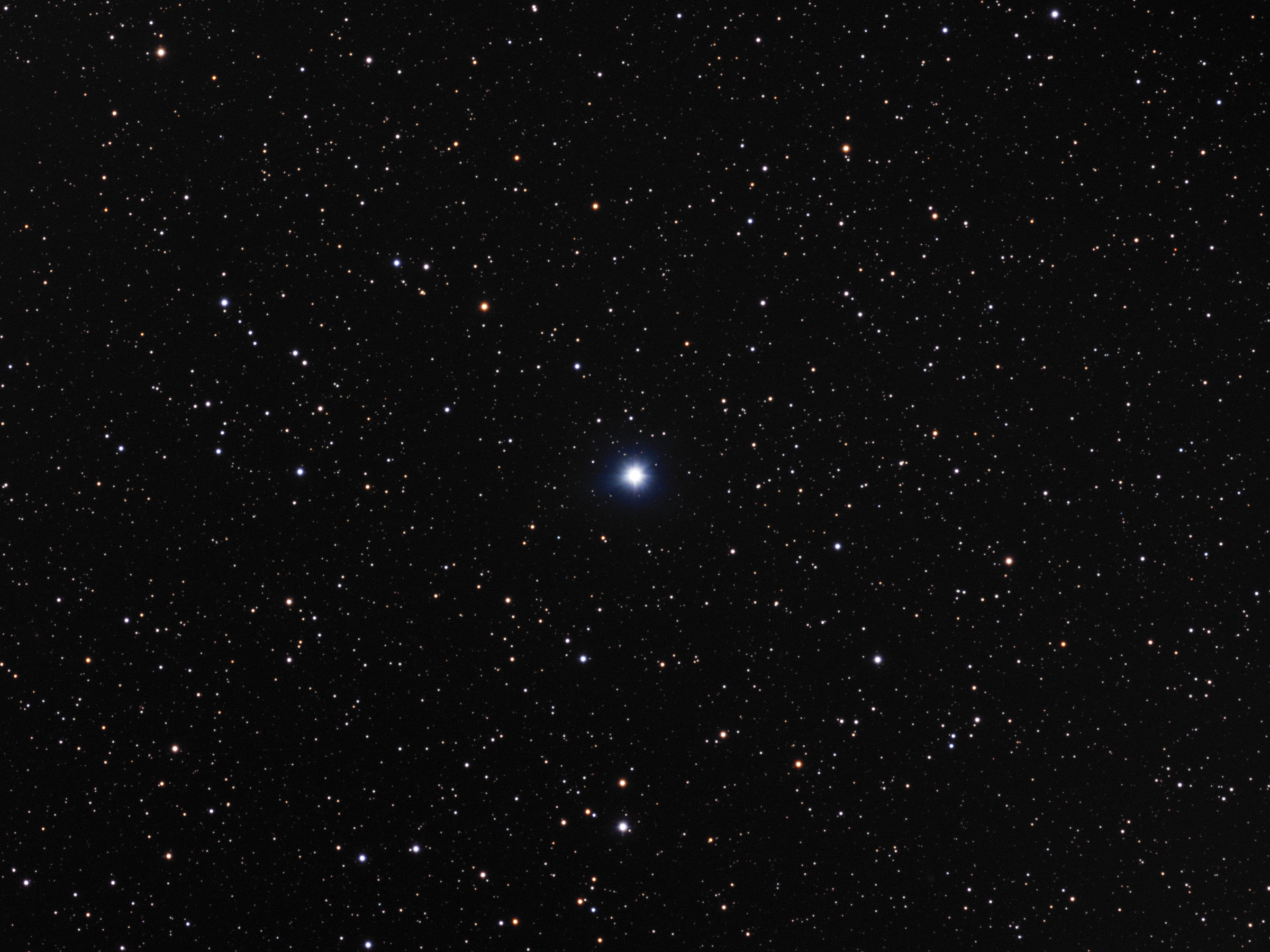
λ Cassiopeiae in optical light

Both components are blue-white B-type main-sequence stars. The brighter member, component A, has an apparent magnitude of +5.5, while its companion, component B, has an apparent magnitude of +5.8. The two stars are separated by 0.6 arcseconds and complete one orbit around their common centre of mass about once every 250 years. The primary displays an infrared excess, possibly due to a debris disk or other orbiting material.
