= List of stars in Perseus =

This is the list of notable stars in the constellation Perseus, sorted by decreasing brightness.

Name	B	F	Var	HD	HIP	RA	Dec	vis. mag.	abs. mag.	Dist. (ly)	Sp. class	Notes
α Per	α	33		20902	15863	03^{h} 24^{m} 19.35^{s}	+49° 51′ 40.5″	1.79	−4.50	592	F5Ib	Mirfak, Mirphak, Marphak, Markfak, Algenib, Alcheb
Algol	β	26		19356	14576	03^{h} 08^{m} 10.13^{s}	+40° 57′ 20.3″	2.09	−0.18	93	B8V	El Ghoul, Gorgona, Gorgonea Prima, Demon Star, Ghoul Star; prototype of Algol variables
ζ Per	ζ	44		24398	18246	03^{h} 54^{m} 07.92^{s}	+31° 53′ 01.2″	2.84	−4.55	982	B1Ib	Atik, Menkhib
ε Per	ε	45		24760	18532	03^{h} 57^{m} 51.22^{s}	+40° 00′ 37.0″	2.90	−3.19	538	B0.5V	Áldu, β Cep variable
γ Per A	γ	23		18925	14328	03^{h} 04^{m} 47.79^{s}	+53° 30′ 23.2″	2.91	−1.57	256	G8III+...	
γ Per B	γ	23		18926		03^{h} 04^{m} 44.10^{s}	+53° 31′ 10.0″	3.00				
δ Per	δ	39		22928	17358	03^{h} 42^{m} 55.48^{s}	+47° 47′ 15.6″	3.01	−3.04	528	B5III SB	Sarvvis, γ Cas variable
ρ Per	ρ	25		19058	14354	03^{h} 05^{m} 10.50^{s}	+38° 50′ 25.9″	3.32	−1.67	325	M3IIIvar	Gorgonea Tertia
η Per	η	15		17506	13268	02^{h} 50^{m} 41.79^{s}	+55° 53′ 43.9″	3.77	−4.28	1331	K3Ib comp SB	Miram
ν Per	ν	41		23230	17529	03^{h} 45^{m} 11.64^{s}	+42° 34′ 42.8″	3.77	−2.39	556	F5IIvar	
κ Per	κ	27		19476	14668	03^{h} 09^{m} 29.63^{s}	+44° 51′ 28.4″	3.79	1.11	112	K0III	Misam
ο Per	ο	38		23180	17448	03^{h} 44^{m} 19.13^{s}	+32° 17′ 17.8″	3.84	−4.44	1475	B1III	Atik, Ati, Al Atik, Atiks
τ Per A	τ	18		17878	13531	02^{h} 54^{m} 15.46^{s}	+52° 45′ 45.0″	3.93	−0.48	248	G4III...	Algol variable
48 Per	c	48	MX	25940	19343	04^{h} 08^{m} 39.67^{s}	+47° 42′ 45.3″	3.96	−2.19	553	B3Ve	MX Per; γ Cas variable
ξ Per	ξ	46		24912	18614	03^{h} 58^{m} 57.90^{s}	+35° 47′ 27.7″	3.98	−4.70	1772	O7.5Iab:	Menkib, Menkhib, Menchib
τ Per B	τ	18		17879		02^{h} 54^{m} 20.80^{s}	+52° 45′ 30.0″	4.00				
φ Per	φ			10516	8068	01^{h} 43^{m} 39.62^{s}	+50° 41′ 19.6″	4.01	−2.70	716	B2Vpe	Dajiangjunbei, γ Cas variable
ι Per	ι			19373	14632	03^{h} 09^{m} 02.88^{s}	+49° 36′ 48.6″	4.05	3.94	34	G0V	nearby Sun-like star
θ Per	θ	13		16895	12777	02^{h} 44^{m} 11.69^{s}	+49° 13′ 43.2″	4.10	3.85	37	F7V	
μ Per	μ	51		26630	19812	04^{h} 14^{m} 53.86^{s}	+48° 24′ 33.7″	4.12	−2.61	723	G0Ib...	
16 Per		16		17584	13254	02^{h} 50^{m} 34.91^{s}	+38° 19′ 08.1″	4.22	1.26	128	F2III	
λ Per	λ	47		25642	19167	04^{h} 06^{m} 35.06^{s}	+50° 21′ 04.9″	4.25	−0.88	346	A0IVn	Jīshuǐ (積水)
58 Per	e	58		29094	21476	04^{h} 36^{m} 41.43^{s}	+41° 15′ 53.5″	4.25	−2.22	642	G8II comp	
ψ Per	ψ	37		22192	16826	03^{h} 36^{m} 29.36^{s}	+48° 11′ 33.7″	4.32	−2.34	700	B5Ve	γ Cas variable
σ Per	σ	35		21552	16335	03^{h} 30^{m} 34.48^{s}	+47° 59′ 42.6″	4.36	−0.81	353	K3III	
17 Per		17		17709	13328	02^{h} 51^{m} 30.83^{s}	+35° 03′ 35.6″	4.56	−0.93	409	K5III	
HD 26961	b			26961	20070	04^{h} 18^{m} 14.58^{s}	+50° 17′ 44.3″	4.60	−0.35	318	A2V	
ω Per	ω	28		19656	14817	03^{h} 11^{m} 17.40^{s}	+39° 36′ 41.7″	4.61	−0.25	305	K1III	Gorgonea Quarta
34 Per		34		21428	16244	03^{h} 29^{m} 22.03^{s}	+49° 30′ 32.5″	4.67	−1.50	558	B3V	
52 Per	f	52		26673	19811	04^{h} 14^{m} 53.31^{s}	+40° 29′ 01.4″	4.67	−1.75	627	G5II comp	
π Per	π	22		18411	13879	02^{h} 58^{m} 45.65^{s}	+39° 39′ 46.2″	4.68	−0.32	325	A2Vn	Gorgonea Secunda
HD 18970	k			18970	14382	03^{h} 05^{m} 32.43^{s}	+56° 42′ 20.0″	4.77	0.78	204	K0II-III	
53 Per	d	53	V469	27396	20354	04^{h} 21^{m} 33.15^{s}	+46° 29′ 56.3″	4.80	−0.97	464	B4IV	V469 Per; β Cep variable
HD 20468				20468	15416	03^{h} 18^{m} 43.82^{s}	+34° 13′ 21.6″	4.85	−3.43	1475	K2II	
1 Aur		(1)		30504	22453	04^{h} 49^{m} 54.67^{s}	+37° 29′ 17.5″	4.89	−1.16	528	K4II	
12 Per		12		16739	12623	02^{h} 42^{m} 14.93^{s}	+40° 11′ 39.8″	4.91	2.95	80	F9V	
54 Per		54		27348	20252	04^{h} 20^{m} 24.66^{s}	+34° 34′ 00.3″	4.93	0.72	226	G8III	
24 Per		24		18449	13905	02^{h} 59^{m} 03.71^{s}	+35° 10′ 59.2″	4.94	−0.22	350	K2III	
32 Per	l	32		20677	15648	03^{h} 21^{m} 26.61^{s}	+43° 19′ 46.7″	4.96	1.57	155	A3V	
40 Per	o	40		22951	17313	03^{h} 42^{m} 22.64^{s}	+33° 57′ 54.1″	4.97	−2.29	924	B0.5V	
4 Per	g	4		12303	9505	02^{h} 02^{m} 18.07^{s}	+54° 29′ 15.2″	4.99	−1.79	739	B8III	
HD 21278				21278	16147	03^{h} 28^{m} 03.05^{s}	+49° 03′ 46.6″	4.99	−1.22	570	B5V	
				20123	15219	03^{h} 16^{m} 12.20^{s}	+50° 56′ 15.8″	5.04	−2.00	834	G5II	
31 Per		31		20418	15444	03^{h} 19^{m} 07.62^{s}	+50° 05′ 42.1″	5.05	−0.79	481	B5V	
21 Per		21	LT	18296	13775	02^{h} 57^{m} 17.28^{s}	+31° 56′ 03.5″	5.10	−0.27	387	B9p...	LT Per; α² CVn variable
42 Per	n	42	V467	23848	17886	03^{h} 49^{m} 32.70^{s}	+33° 05′ 29.0″	5.14	0.34	297	A3V	Tiānchán (天讒)
9 Per	i	9	V474	14489	11060	02^{h} 22^{m} 21.43^{s}	+55° 50′ 44.4″	5.16	−3.83	2050	A2Ia	V474 Per; α Cyg variable
29 Per		29		20365	15404	03^{h} 18^{m} 37.72^{s}	+50° 13′ 20.0″	5.16	−0.89	528	B3V	
				18537	14043	03^{h} 00^{m} 52.18^{s}	+52° 21′ 06.5″	5.24	−1.70	795	B7V	
43 Per	A	43		24546	18453	03^{h} 56^{m} 36.44^{s}	+50° 41′ 44.5″	5.28	2.23	133	F5IV	
				27971	20704	04^{h} 26^{m} 06.26^{s}	+31° 26′ 21.1″	5.29	0.93	243	K1III	
36 Per		36		21770	16499	03^{h} 32^{m} 26.30^{s}	+46° 03′ 25.4″	5.30	2.49	119	F4IIIvar	
59 Per		59		29722	21928	04^{h} 42^{m} 54.30^{s}	+43° 21′ 55.0″	5.30	0.70	271	A1Vn	
V575 Per			V575	20809	15770	03^{h} 23^{m} 13.18^{s}	+49° 12′ 48.0″	5.32	−1.09	625	B5V	
20 Per		20		17904	13490	02^{h} 53^{m} 42.58^{s}	+38° 20′ 15.6″	5.34	1.05	235	F4Vvar	
				24504	18396	03^{h} 55^{m} 58.16^{s}	+47° 52′ 17.3″	5.39	−1.68	845	B6V	
14 Per		14		16901	12768	02^{h} 44^{m} 05.16^{s}	+44° 17′ 49.4″	5.43	−1.20	692	G0Ib	
				27084	20156	04^{h} 19^{m} 13.18^{s}	+50° 02′ 55.8″	5.46	0.96	259	A7V	
				18474	13965	02^{h} 59^{m} 49.78^{s}	+47° 13′ 14.3″	5.47	−0.69	557	G4p	
V396 Per			V396	21699	16470	03^{h} 32^{m} 08.58^{s}	+48° 01′ 24.7″	5.47	−0.80	585	B8IIIp Mn	SX Ari variable
30 Per		30		20315	15338	03^{h} 17^{m} 47.33^{s}	+44° 01′ 30.3″	5.49	−0.99	644	B8V...	
				24640	18434	03^{h} 56^{m} 28.69^{s}	+35° 04′ 51.3″	5.49	−1.88	970	B1.5V	
50 Per		50	V582	25998	19335	04^{h} 08^{m} 36.49^{s}	+38° 02′ 24.8″	5.52	3.87	70	F7V	V582 Per; RS CVn variable
1 Per		1	V436	11241	8704	01^{h} 51^{m} 59.31^{s}	+55° 08′ 50.7″	5.53	−1.96	1028	B1.5V	V436 Per; eclipsing binary
				22780	17203	03^{h} 41^{m} 07.84^{s}	+37° 34′ 49.0″	5.55	−1.42	807	B7Vn	
HD 27192	b^{2}			27192	20234	04^{h} 20^{m} 11.51^{s}	+50° 55′ 15.4″	5.55	−2.26	1190	B1.5IV	
				21362	16210	03^{h} 28^{m} 52.31^{s}	+49° 50′ 54.4″	5.58	−0.57	553	B6Vn	
				23193	17460	03^{h} 44^{m} 31.40^{s}	+36° 27′ 36.7″	5.60	0.56	332	A2m	
				23838	17932	03^{h} 50^{m} 04.45^{s}	+44° 58′ 04.5″	5.65	0.52	346	G2III...	
V472 Per			V472	12953	9990	02^{h} 08^{m} 40.58^{s}	+58° 25′ 25.0″	5.66	−3.08	1821	A1Ia	α Cyg variable
				23300	17584	03^{h} 45^{m} 59.25^{s}	+45° 40′ 55.0″	5.66	−1.86	1038	B6V	
				29526	21823	04^{h} 41^{m} 24.09^{s}	+48° 18′ 03.6″	5.66	0.76	311	A0V	
2 Per		2		11291	8714	01^{h} 52^{m} 09.35^{s}	+50° 47′ 34.3″	5.70	−0.19	492	B9p...	
3 Per		3		11949	9222	01^{h} 58^{m} 33.50^{s}	+49° 12′ 15.3″	5.70	1.31	246	K0IV	
				21402	16168	03^{h} 28^{m} 20.68^{s}	+33° 48′ 27.7″	5.72	0.61	343	A2V	
55 Per		55		27777	20579	04^{h} 24^{m} 29.14^{s}	+34° 07′ 51.0″	5.73	−0.63	610	B8V	
8 Per		8		13982	10718	02^{h} 17^{m} 59.82^{s}	+57° 53′ 59.3″	5.75	0.43	379	K3III	
				26311	19525	04^{h} 10^{m} 59.02^{s}	+33° 35′ 12.5″	5.75	−0.38	548	K1II-III	
11 Per		11		16727	12692	02^{h} 43^{m} 02.80^{s}	+55° 06′ 21.9″	5.76	0.21	420	B7IIIp...	
				24240	18212	03^{h} 53^{m} 38.67^{s}	+48° 39′ 02.0″	5.76	0.16	430	K0III	
56 Per		56		27786	20591	04^{h} 24^{m} 37.42^{s}	+33° 57′ 35.6″	5.77	2.67	136	F4V	
				20995	15876	03^{h} 24^{m} 29.68^{s}	+33° 32′ 09.7″	5.78	−0.26	527	A0V	
				24131	18081	03^{h} 51^{m} 53.72^{s}	+34° 21′ 32.9″	5.78	−1.73	1035	B1V	
				20041	15192	03^{h} 15^{m} 47.97^{s}	+57° 08′ 26.3″	5.79	−2.68	1614	A0Ia	
IW Per			IW	21912	16591	03^{h} 33^{m} 35.02^{s}	+39° 53′ 58.5″	5.79	2.10	178	A5m	
				21551	16340	03^{h} 30^{m} 36.93^{s}	+48° 06′ 13.2″	5.82	−1.31	869	B8V	
				16735	12686	02^{h} 42^{m} 59.47^{s}	+53° 31′ 34.3″	5.85	0.34	413	K0II-III	
				17656	13339	02^{h} 51^{m} 41.75^{s}	+46° 50′ 31.2″	5.86	0.43	397	G8III	
				29721	21972	04^{h} 43^{m} 21.60^{s}	+49° 58′ 25.8″	5.86	−0.61	640	B9III	
				18482	13949	02^{h} 59^{m} 39.87^{s}	+41° 01′ 59.0″	5.89	−1.00	780	K2	
				21856	16518	03^{h} 32^{m} 40.02^{s}	+35° 27′ 42.2″	5.91	−2.60	1638	B1V	
				19845	15004	03^{h} 13^{m} 23.86^{s}	+48° 10′ 37.2″	5.93	1.03	311	G9III	
				20675	15669	03^{h} 21^{m} 52.37^{s}	+49° 04′ 15.8″	5.94	2.64	149	F6V	
V376 Per			V376	23728	17846	03^{h} 49^{m} 08.12^{s}	+43° 57′ 46.9″	5.95	1.75	226	A9IV	δ Sct variable
				27278	20241	04^{h} 20^{m} 14.42^{s}	+41° 48′ 29.4″	5.95	0.82	346	K0III	
				11151	8598	01^{h} 50^{m} 57.09^{s}	+51° 56′ 01.3″	5.96	2.71	145	F5V	
				20346	15334	03^{h} 17^{m} 45.74^{s}	+39° 17′ 00.3″	5.97	−0.38	607	A2IV	
				29645	21847	04^{h} 41^{m} 50.08^{s}	+38° 16′ 49.5″	5.97	3.50	102	G0V	
V573 Per			V573	20277	15241	03^{h} 16^{m} 35.19^{s}	+32° 11′ 03.2″	5.98	−0.16	551	G8IV	
7 Per	χ	7		13994	10729	02^{h} 18^{m} 04.60^{s}	+57° 30′ 58.8″	5.99	−0.70	710	G7III	note that χ Per usually refers to NGC 884, an open cluster
				30138	22220	04^{h} 46^{m} 44.47^{s}	+40° 18′ 45.6″	5.99	0.32	443	G9III	
				11031	8475	01^{h} 49^{m} 15.56^{s}	+47° 53′ 49.0″	6.01	0.97	331	A3V	
				18155	13713	02^{h} 56^{m} 33.30^{s}	+47° 09′ 50.4″	6.05	−2.84	1952	K3III:	
				18339	13832	02^{h} 58^{m} 02.33^{s}	+38° 36′ 53.9″	6.06	−1.70	1164	K3III	
				19066	14365	03^{h} 05^{m} 21.03^{s}	+40° 34′ 55.9″	6.06	0.57	408	K0III	
				23049	17437	03^{h} 44^{m} 06.43^{s}	+48° 31′ 25.3″	6.06	−0.96	827	K4III	
				20063	15118	03^{h} 14^{m} 56.55^{s}	+42° 30′ 13.0″	6.07	1.88	225	K2III	
49 Per		49		25975	19302	04^{h} 08^{m} 15.46^{s}	+37° 43′ 40.7″	6.07	2.85	144	K1III	
V576 Per			V576	21071	15988	03^{h} 25^{m} 57.36^{s}	+49° 07′ 15.0″	6.09	−0.19	603	B7V	Slow pulsator
57 Per	m	57		28704	21242	04^{h} 33^{m} 24.90^{s}	+43° 03′ 50.0″	6.09	2.04	211	F0V	
				29866	22034	04^{h} 44^{m} 13.01^{s}	+40° 47′ 11.4″	6.09	−0.01	542	B8IVn	
				18991	14392	03^{h} 05^{m} 40.15^{s}	+56° 04′ 08.5″	6.10	1.71	246	G9III	
				23139	17475	03^{h} 44^{m} 40.91^{s}	+46° 05′ 59.5″	6.10	−0.12	573	A7IV	
				18552	13997	03^{h} 00^{m} 11.88^{s}	+38° 07′ 54.5″	6.11	−1.56	1113	B8Vn	
				19736	14887	03^{h} 12^{m} 09.54^{s}	+42° 22′ 33.4″	6.15	−0.37	657	B4V	
				20162	15209	03^{h} 16^{m} 04.43^{s}	+45° 20′ 46.4″	6.15	−1.10	918	M2III	
				27349	20231	04^{h} 20^{m} 09.95^{s}	+31° 57′ 11.5″	6.16	−0.84	819	K5	
				23552	17772	03^{h} 48^{m} 18.08^{s}	+50° 44′ 12.4″	6.18	−0.12	594	B8Vn	
				28459	21038	04^{h} 30^{m} 38.40^{s}	+32° 27′ 28.1″	6.18	1.31	307	B9.5Vn	
				21455	16252	03^{h} 29^{m} 26.26^{s}	+46° 56′ 16.6″	6.21	−0.03	576	B7V	
				18153	13732	02^{h} 56^{m} 50.66^{s}	+51° 15′ 40.9″	6.22	−0.36	675	K5III	
				24167	18094	03^{h} 52^{m} 04.45^{s}	+31° 10′ 07.2″	6.22	0.72	411	A5V	
V545 Per			V545	27026	20063	04^{h} 18^{m} 08.09^{s}	+42° 08′ 28.5″	6.22	0.84	389	B9V	
				17818	13462	02^{h} 53^{m} 21.07^{s}	+48° 34′ 11.9″	6.23	−4.77	5175	G5Iab:	
V423 Per				20210	15204	03^{h} 16^{m} 01.86^{s}	+34° 41′ 18.6″	6.23	2.12	201	A1m	Ellipsoidal var.
10 Per		10	V554	14818	11279	02^{h} 25^{m} 16.03^{s}	+56° 36′ 35.4″	6.25	−3.93	3543	B2Ia	V554 Per; α Cyg variable
V480 Per			V480	17378	13178	02^{h} 49^{m} 30.74^{s}	+57° 05′ 03.6″	6.25			A5Ia	α Cyg variable
				27650	20498	04^{h} 23^{m} 35.80^{s}	+42° 25′ 40.8″	6.25	0.10	553	A1sp...	
				28503	21108	04^{h} 31^{m} 24.10^{s}	+40° 00′ 36.8″	6.25	−2.34	1707	B8V	
				23626	17732	03^{h} 47^{m} 49.04^{s}	+32° 11′ 43.8″	6.26	2.53	182	G0	
				17228	12982	02^{h} 46^{m} 58.28^{s}	+35° 59′ 00.7″	6.27	0.77	411	G8III	
				11335	8771	01^{h} 52^{m} 50.74^{s}	+51° 28′ 29.5″	6.28	0.37	495	A3V	
				17240	12990	02^{h} 47^{m} 03.60^{s}	+35° 33′ 17.3″	6.28	2.92	153	A9V	
V440 Per			V440	14662	11174	02^{h} 23^{m} 51.75^{s}	+55° 21′ 53.5″	6.29	−2.66	2012	F7Ib	δ Cep variable
				21620	16424	03^{h} 31^{m} 29.35^{s}	+49° 12′ 35.2″	6.29	0.51	468	A0Vn	
				16780	12690	02^{h} 43^{m} 01.85^{s}	+48° 15′ 54.9″	6.30	−1.84	1387	G5	
				20193	15191	03^{h} 15^{m} 47.15^{s}	+32° 51′ 24.0″	6.30	2.34	202	F4Vwvar	
				13137	10115	02^{h} 10^{m} 07.73^{s}	+53° 50′ 35.5″	6.31	0.02	590	G8III	
				26702	19810	04^{h} 14^{m} 52.07^{s}	+37° 32′ 33.6″	6.31	0.76	419	G5	
				19735	14914	03^{h} 12^{m} 26.36^{s}	+47° 43′ 33.9″	6.32	0.38	502	K5III	
				24843	18565	03^{h} 58^{m} 29.13^{s}	+38° 50′ 25.3″	6.32	0.79	416	K1III:	
				19268	14566	03^{h} 08^{m} 03.83^{s}	+52° 12′ 48.8″	6.33	−0.31	694	B5V	
				10110	7786	01^{h} 40^{m} 13.12^{s}	+53° 52′ 05.8″	6.35	−0.03	616	K5III	
				17743	13424	02^{h} 52^{m} 52.03^{s}	+52° 59′ 50.6″	6.35	−1.10	1009	B8III	
				28591	21144	04^{h} 31^{m} 56.94^{s}	+36° 44′ 34.3″	6.35	0.99	385	G5	
5 Per		5		13267	10227	02^{h} 11^{m} 29.19^{s}	+57° 38′ 44.0″	6.38	−3.08	2547	B5Ia	
V521 Per			V521	19279	14544	03^{h} 07^{m} 47.34^{s}	+47° 18′ 31.3″	6.38	1.99	246	A3Vnn	δ Sct variable
				25152	18769	04^{h} 01^{m} 14.84^{s}	+36° 59′ 22.1″	6.39	1.10	373	A0V	
				14433	11020	02^{h} 21^{m} 55.44^{s}	+57° 14′ 34.5″	6.40	−3.37	2937	A1Ia	
				21661	16447	03^{h} 31^{m} 49.04^{s}	+49° 24′ 03.9″	6.41	−2.68	2145	B9III	
				22402	16938	03^{h} 38^{m} 00.17^{s}	+42° 34′ 58.4″	6.41	−0.62	830	B8Vn	
KP Per			KP	21803	16516	03^{h} 32^{m} 38.98^{s}	+44° 51′ 20.8″	6.42	−1.98	1560	B2IV	β Cep variable
				13476	10379	02^{h} 13^{m} 41.61^{s}	+58° 33′ 38.1″	6.43	−3.30	2885	A3Iab	
				11408	8847	01^{h} 53^{m} 48.46^{s}	+55° 35′ 51.6″	6.44	2.11	240	A5m	
				17605	13257	02^{h} 50^{m} 35.30^{s}	+36° 56′ 55.1″	6.44	2.52	198	G0	
				20283	15282	03^{h} 17^{m} 11.45^{s}	+40° 28′ 59.0″	6.44	−0.23	704	B9p	
				17245	13036	02^{h} 47^{m} 31.15^{s}	+44° 16′ 20.0″	6.45	−2.36	1884	F5	
				17484	13176	02^{h} 49^{m} 26.93^{s}	+37° 19′ 35.1″	6.45	1.12	379	F6III-IV	
				23301	17558	03^{h} 45^{m} 37.11^{s}	+38° 40′ 34.4″	6.45	0.70	460	K0	
V572 Per			V572	20096	15193	03^{h} 15^{m} 48.65^{s}	+50° 57′ 21.5″	6.46	0.95	413	A0	
				26605	19746	04^{h} 13^{m} 59.73^{s}	+37° 58′ 01.7″	6.47	1.06	394	G9III	
				13854	10633	02^{h} 16^{m} 51.72^{s}	+57° 03′ 18.9″	6.48	−2.84	2380	B1Iab	
V509 Per			V509	18878	14264	03^{h} 03^{m} 56.75^{s}	+47° 50′ 54.6″	6.48	1.24	363	F0	δ Sct variable
				13519	10361	02^{h} 13^{m} 33.51^{s}	+53° 03′ 30.9″	6.50	−5.54	8359	K5	
				21684	16425	03^{h} 31^{m} 30.28^{s}	+40° 45′ 36.1″	6.50	0.87	436	A5	
V520 Per		(61)	V520	14134	10805	02^{h} 19^{m} 04.45^{s}	+57° 08′ 07.8″	6.55	−7.1	7,500	B3Ia	61 Andromedae
X Per			X	24534	18350	03^{h} 55^{m} 23.08^{s}	+31° 02′ 45.1″	6.79	−2.80	2694	O9.5pe	
HD 23596				23596	17747	03^{h} 48^{m} 00.37^{s}	+40° 31′ 50.3″	7.24	3.66	169	F8	has a planet (b)
KS Per			KS	30353	22365	04^{h} 48^{m} 53.35^{s}	+43° 16′ 32.1″	7.70	−3.3	2938	Ape	Bidelman's Peculiar Star
HD 17092				17092		02^{h} 46^{m} 22.12^{s}	+49° 39′ 11.1″	7.73	1.76	750	K0V	has a planet (b)
HD 16760				16760	12638	02^{h} 42^{m} 21.31^{s}	+38° 37′ 07.1″	8.74	5.41	163	G5V	has a companion star (B)
HD 22781				22781	17187	03^{h} 40^{m} 49.52^{s}	+31° 49′ 34.6″	8.78	6.21	104	K0	has a planet (b)
HAT-P-29						02^{h} 12^{m} 31.48^{s}	+51° 46′ 43.6″	11.9	4.11	1050	F8	Muspelheim, has a transiting planet (b)
HAT-P-15						04^{h} 24^{m} 59.53^{s}	+39° 27′ 38.3″	12.16	5.77	619	G5	Berehynia, has a transiting planet (b)
Table legend: • Name = Proper name • B = Bayer designation • F or/and G. = Flamsteed designation or Gould designation • Var = Variable-star designation • HD = Henry Draper Catalogue designation number • HIP = Hipparcos Catalogue designation number • RA = Right ascension for the Epoch/Equinox J2000.0 • Dec = Declination for the Epoch/Equinox J2000.0 • vis. mag. = visual magnitude (m or m_{v}), also known as apparent magnitude • abs. mag. = absolute magnitude (M_{v}) • Dist. (ly) = Distance in light-years from Earth • Sp. class = Spectral class of the star in the stellar classification system • Notes = Common name(s) or alternate name(s); comments; notable properties [for example: multiple star status, range of variability if it is a variable star, exoplanets, etc.]

== See also ==
- List of stars by constellation
