= Perseus in Chinese astronomy =

Constellation in Chinese astronomy

According to traditional Chinese uranography, the modern constellation Perseus is located within the western quadrant of the sky, which is symbolized as the White Tiger of the West (西方白虎, Xī Fāng Bái Hǔ).

The name of the western constellation in modern Chinese is 英仙座 (yīng xiān zuò), which means "the brave god constellation".

== Stars ==
The map of Chinese constellation in constellation Perseus area consists of:

Four Symbols	Mansion (Chinese name)	Romanization	Translation	Asterisms (Chinese name)	Romanization	Translation	Western star name	Proper Name	Chinese star name	Romanization	Translation
White Tiger of the West (西方白虎)	婁	Lóu	Bond	天大將軍	Tiāndàjiāngjūn	Heaven's Great General					
White Tiger of the West (西方白虎)	婁	Lóu	Bond	天大將軍	Tiāndàjiāngjūn	Heaven's Great General	φ Per	Dajiangjunbei	天大將軍二	Tiāndàjiāngjūnèr	2nd star
White Tiger of the West (西方白虎)	婁	Lóu	Bond	天大將軍	Tiāndàjiāngjūn	Heaven's Great General	3 Per		天大將軍增十五	Tiāndàjiāngjūnzēngshíwǔ	15th additional star
White Tiger of the West (西方白虎)	婁	Lóu	Bond	天大將軍	Tiāndàjiāngjūn	Heaven's Great General	2 Per		天大將軍增十六	Tiāndàjiāngjūnzēngshíliù	16th additional star
White Tiger of the West (西方白虎)	婁	Lóu	Bond	天大將軍	Tiāndàjiāngjūn	Heaven's Great General	14 Per		天大将军增十七	Tiāndàjiāngjūnzēngshíqī	17th additional star
White Tiger of the West (西方白虎)	胃	Wèi	Stomach								
White Tiger of the West (西方白虎)	胃	Wèi	Stomach	胃	Wèi	Stomach	21 Per		胃宿增三	Wèisùzēngsān	3rd additional star
White Tiger of the West (西方白虎)	胃	Wèi	Stomach	大陵	Dàlíng	Mausoleum					
White Tiger of the West (西方白虎)	胃	Wèi	Stomach	大陵	Dàlíng	Mausoleum	9 Per		大陵一	Dàlíngyī	1st star
White Tiger of the West (西方白虎)	胃	Wèi	Stomach	大陵	Dàlíng	Mausoleum	τ Per		大陵二	Dàlíngèr	2nd star
White Tiger of the West (西方白虎)	胃	Wèi	Stomach	大陵	Dàlíng	Mausoleum	ι Per		大陵三	Dàlíngsān	3rd star
White Tiger of the West (西方白虎)	胃	Wèi	Stomach	大陵	Dàlíng	Mausoleum	κ Per	Misam (for component Aa)	大陵四	Dàlíngsì	4th star
White Tiger of the West (西方白虎)	胃	Wèi	Stomach	大陵	Dàlíng	Mausoleum	β Per	Algol			
White Tiger of the West (西方白虎)	胃	Wèi	Stomach	大陵	Dàlíng	Mausoleum	β Per	Algol	大陵五	Dàlíngwu	5th star
White Tiger of the West (西方白虎)	胃	Wèi	Stomach	大陵	Dàlíng	Mausoleum	β Per	Algol	天仓北第三星	Tiāncāngběidìsānxīng	Third star in the north of Square Celestial Granary constellation
White Tiger of the West (西方白虎)	胃	Wèi	Stomach	大陵	Dàlíng	Mausoleum	ρ Per		大陵六	Dàlíngliù	6th star
White Tiger of the West (西方白虎)	胃	Wèi	Stomach	大陵	Dàlíng	Mausoleum	16 Per		大陵七	Dàlíngqī	7th star
White Tiger of the West (西方白虎)	胃	Wèi	Stomach	大陵	Dàlíng	Mausoleum	12 Per		大陵八	Dàlíngbā	8th star
White Tiger of the West (西方白虎)	胃	Wèi	Stomach	大陵	Dàlíng	Mausoleum	χ Per		大陵增一	Dàlíngzēngyī	1st additional star
White Tiger of the West (西方白虎)	胃	Wèi	Stomach	大陵	Dàlíng	Mausoleum	8 Per		大陵增二	Dàlíngzēngèr	2nd additional star
White Tiger of the West (西方白虎)	胃	Wèi	Stomach	大陵	Dàlíng	Mausoleum	5 Per		大陵增三	Dàlíngzēngsān	3rd additional star
White Tiger of the West (西方白虎)	胃	Wèi	Stomach	大陵	Dàlíng	Mausoleum	1 Per		大陵增四	Dàlíngzēngsì	4th additional star
White Tiger of the West (西方白虎)	胃	Wèi	Stomach	大陵	Dàlíng	Mausoleum	4 Per		大陵增五	Dàlíngzēngwǔ	5th additional star
White Tiger of the West (西方白虎)	胃	Wèi	Stomach	大陵	Dàlíng	Mausoleum	θ Per		大陵增十三	Dàlíngzēngshísān	13th additional star
White Tiger of the West (西方白虎)	胃	Wèi	Stomach	大陵	Dàlíng	Mausoleum	14 Per		大陵增十四	Dàlíngzēngshísì	14th additional star
White Tiger of the West (西方白虎)	胃	Wèi	Stomach	大陵	Dàlíng	Mausoleum	20 Per		大陵增十五	Dàlíngzēngshíwǔ	15th additional star
White Tiger of the West (西方白虎)	胃	Wèi	Stomach	大陵	Dàlíng	Mausoleum	17 Per		大陵增十六	Dàlíngzēngshíliù	16th additional star
White Tiger of the West (西方白虎)	胃	Wèi	Stomach	大陵	Dàlíng	Mausoleum	HD 18665		大陵增十七	Dàlíngzēngshíqī	17th additional star
White Tiger of the West (西方白虎)	胃	Wèi	Stomach	大陵	Dàlíng	Mausoleum	ω Per		大陵增十八	Dàlíngzēngshíbā	18th additional star
White Tiger of the West (西方白虎)	胃	Wèi	Stomach	大陵	Dàlíng	Mausoleum	32 Per		大陵增十九	Dàlíngzēngshíjiǔ	19th additional star
White Tiger of the West (西方白虎)	胃	Wèi	Stomach	大陵	Dàlíng	Mausoleum	30 Per		大陵增二十	Dàlíngzēngèrshí	20th additional star
White Tiger of the West (西方白虎)	胃	Wèi	Stomach	天船	Tiānchuán	Celestial Boat					
White Tiger of the West (西方白虎)	胃	Wèi	Stomach	天船	Tiānchuán	Celestial Boat	η Per	Miram (for component A)	天船一	Tiānchuányī	1st star
White Tiger of the West (西方白虎)	胃	Wèi	Stomach	天船	Tiānchuán	Celestial Boat	γ Per		天船二	Tiānchuánèr	2nd star
White Tiger of the West (西方白虎)	胃	Wèi	Stomach	天船	Tiānchuán	Celestial Boat	α Per	Mirfak	天船三	Tiānchuánsān	3rd star
White Tiger of the West (西方白虎)	胃	Wèi	Stomach	天船	Tiānchuán	Celestial Boat	ψ Per		天船四	Tiānchuánsì	4th star
White Tiger of the West (西方白虎)	胃	Wèi	Stomach	天船	Tiānchuán	Celestial Boat	δ Per	Sarvvis	天船五	Tiānchuánwu	5th star
White Tiger of the West (西方白虎)	胃	Wèi	Stomach	天船	Tiānchuán	Celestial Boat	48 Per		天船六	Tiānchuánliù	6th star
White Tiger of the West (西方白虎)	胃	Wèi	Stomach	天船	Tiānchuán	Celestial Boat	μ Per		天船七	Tiānchuánqī	7th star
White Tiger of the West (西方白虎)	胃	Wèi	Stomach	天船	Tiānchuán	Celestial Boat	HD 27084		天船八	Tiānchuánbā	8th star
White Tiger of the West (西方白虎)	胃	Wèi	Stomach	天船	Tiānchuán	Celestial Boat	29 Per		天船增一	Tiānchuánzēngyī	1st additional star
White Tiger of the West (西方白虎)	胃	Wèi	Stomach	天船	Tiānchuán	Celestial Boat	31 Per		天船增二	Tiānchuánzēngèr	2nd additional star
White Tiger of the West (西方白虎)	胃	Wèi	Stomach	天船	Tiānchuán	Celestial Boat	34 Per		天船增三	Tiānchuánzēngsān	3rd additional star
White Tiger of the West (西方白虎)	胃	Wèi	Stomach	天船	Tiānchuán	Celestial Boat	σ Per		天船增四	Tiānchuánzēngsì	4th additional star
White Tiger of the West (西方白虎)	胃	Wèi	Stomach	天船	Tiānchuán	Celestial Boat	36 Per		天船增五	Tiānchuánzēngwǔ	5th additional star
White Tiger of the West (西方白虎)	胃	Wèi	Stomach	天船	Tiānchuán	Celestial Boat	53 Per		天船增六	Tiānchuánzēngliù	6th additional star
White Tiger of the West (西方白虎)	胃	Wèi	Stomach	天船	Tiānchuán	Celestial Boat	HD 26961		天船增十	Tiānchuánzēngshí	10th additional star
White Tiger of the West (西方白虎)	胃	Wèi	Stomach	積屍	Jīshī	Heap of Corpses	π Per		積屍	Jīshī	(One star of)
White Tiger of the West (西方白虎)	胃	Wèi	Stomach	積水	Jīshuǐ	Stored Water					
White Tiger of the West (西方白虎)	胃	Wèi	Stomach	積水	Jīshuǐ	Stored Water	λ Per		積水	Jīshuǐ	(One star of)
White Tiger of the West (西方白虎)	胃	Wèi	Stomach	積水	Jīshuǐ	Stored Water	43 Per		積水增一	Jīshuǐzēngyī	1st additional star
White Tiger of the West (西方白虎)	昴	Mǎo	Hairy Head	卷舌	Juǎnshé	Rolled Tongue					
White Tiger of the West (西方白虎)	昴	Mǎo	Hairy Head	卷舌	Juǎnshé	Rolled Tongue	ν Per		卷舌一	Juǎnshéyī	1st star
White Tiger of the West (西方白虎)	昴	Mǎo	Hairy Head	卷舌	Juǎnshé	Rolled Tongue	ε Per	Áldu			
White Tiger of the West (西方白虎)	昴	Mǎo	Hairy Head	卷舌	Juǎnshé	Rolled Tongue	ε Per	Áldu	卷舌二	Juǎnshéèr	2nd star
White Tiger of the West (西方白虎)	昴	Mǎo	Hairy Head	卷舌	Juǎnshé	Rolled Tongue	ε Per	Áldu	卷舌东第二星	Juǎnshédōngdìèrxīng	Second eastern star
White Tiger of the West (西方白虎)	昴	Mǎo	Hairy Head	卷舌	Juǎnshé	Rolled Tongue	ξ Per	Menkib	卷舌三	Juǎnshésān	3rd star
White Tiger of the West (西方白虎)	昴	Mǎo	Hairy Head	卷舌	Juǎnshé	Rolled Tongue	ζ Per				
White Tiger of the West (西方白虎)	昴	Mǎo	Hairy Head	卷舌	Juǎnshé	Rolled Tongue	ζ Per		卷舌四	Juǎnshésì	4th star
White Tiger of the West (西方白虎)	昴	Mǎo	Hairy Head	卷舌	Juǎnshé	Rolled Tongue	ζ Per		卷舌东第四星	Juǎnshédōngdìsìxīng	Fourth eastern star
White Tiger of the West (西方白虎)	昴	Mǎo	Hairy Head	卷舌	Juǎnshé	Rolled Tongue	ο Per	Atik (for component Aa)	卷舌五	Juǎnshéwu	5th star
White Tiger of the West (西方白虎)	昴	Mǎo	Hairy Head	卷舌	Juǎnshé	Rolled Tongue	40 Per		卷舌六	Juǎnshéliù	6th star
White Tiger of the West (西方白虎)	昴	Mǎo	Hairy Head	卷舌	Juǎnshé	Rolled Tongue	HD 22124		卷舌增一	Juǎnshézēngyī	1st additional star
White Tiger of the West (西方白虎)	昴	Mǎo	Hairy Head	卷舌	Juǎnshé	Rolled Tongue	55 Per		卷舌增二	Juǎnshézēngèr	2nd additional star
White Tiger of the West (西方白虎)	昴	Mǎo	Hairy Head	卷舌	Juǎnshé	Rolled Tongue	54 Per		卷舌增三	Juǎnshézēngsān	3rd additional star
White Tiger of the West (西方白虎)	昴	Mǎo	Hairy Head	卷舌	Juǎnshé	Rolled Tongue	49 Per		卷舌增四	Juǎnshézēngsì	4th additional star
White Tiger of the West (西方白虎)	昴	Mǎo	Hairy Head	卷舌	Juǎnshé	Rolled Tongue	50 Per		卷舌增五	Juǎnshézēngwǔ	5th additional star
White Tiger of the West (西方白虎)	昴	Mǎo	Hairy Head	卷舌	Juǎnshé	Rolled Tongue	52 Per		卷舌增六	Juǎnshézēngliù	6th additional star
White Tiger of the West (西方白虎)	昴	Mǎo	Hairy Head	天讒	Tiānchán	Celestial Slander	42 Per		天讒	Tiānchán	(One star of)
White Tiger of the West (西方白虎)	畢	Bì	Net	五車	Wǔchē	Five Chariots					
White Tiger of the West (西方白虎)	畢	Bì	Net	五車	Wǔchē	Five Chariots	59 Per		五車增一	Wǔchēzēngyī	1st additional star
White Tiger of the West (西方白虎)	畢	Bì	Net	五車	Wǔchē	Five Chariots	57 Per		五車增二	Wǔchēzēngèr	2nd additional star
White Tiger of the West (西方白虎)	畢	Bì	Net	五車	Wǔchē	Five Chariots	58 Per		五車增三	Wǔchēzēngsān	3rd additional star
White Tiger of the West (西方白虎)	畢	Bì	Net	五車	Wǔchē	Five Chariots	HD 28693		五车增十九	Wǔchēzēngshíjiǔ	19th additional star

== See also ==
- Chinese astronomy
- Traditional Chinese star names
- Chinese constellations
