= NGC 1348 =

Star cluster in the Cassiopeia constellation

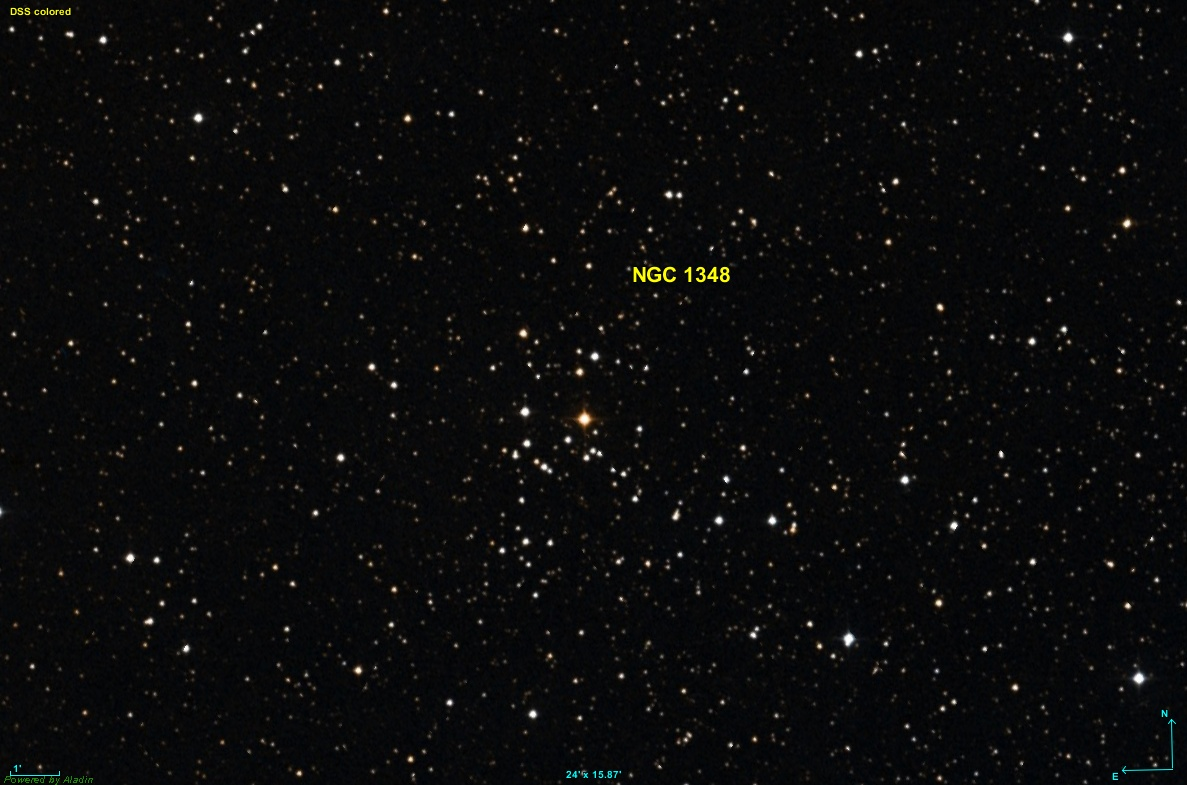
- The open cluster NGC 1348

Observation data (J2000 epoch)
- Right ascension: 03^{h} 36^{m} 02^{s}
- Declination: +51° 30′ 19″
- Distance: 7827.75 (2400)

Physical characteristics

Associations
- Constellation: Perseus

NGC 1348 (also known as [KPS2012] MWSC 0289 and C 0330+512) is an open cluster located in the constellation Perseus containing approximately 106 stars. It was discovered by 19th century English astronomer William Herschel on 28 December 1790. NGC 1348 is moving towards the Sun with a radial velocity of -13.413 km/s. It is located approximately 7825 light years, (2400 pc), from the Earth.
