= K Persei =

Star in the constellation Perseus

k Persei
- Location of k Persei (circled)

Observation data Epoch J2000 Equinox ICRS
- Constellation: Perseus
- Right ascension: 03^{h} 05^{m} 32.41223^{s}
- Declination: +56° 42′ 20.5858″
- Apparent magnitude (V): 4.77

Characteristics
- Evolutionary stage: red giant branch
- Spectral type: G9.5III
- U−B color index: +0.85
- B−V color index: +1.02

Astrometry
Radial velocity (R_{v})	−46.37 km/s
Proper motion (μ)	RA: −12.72 mas/yr Dec.: +70.04 mas/yr
Parallax (π)	15.45±0.27 mas
Distance	211 ± 4 ly (65 ± 1 pc)
Absolute magnitude (M_{V})	0.72

Details
Mass	1.53 M_{☉}
Radius	11 R_{☉}
Luminosity	63.48 L_{☉}
Surface gravity (log g)	2.54 cgs
Temperature	4,900 K
Metallicity [Fe/H]	−0.08 dex
Rotational velocity (v sin i)	< 1.0 km/s

Other designations
- k Persei, BD+56°767, FK5 2217, GC 3674, HIP 14382, HR 918, HD 18970, SAO 23791

Database references
SIMBAD	data

k Persei is a class G9.5III (yellow giant) star in the constellation Perseus. Its apparent magnitude is 4.77 and it is approximately 211 light years away based on parallax.
