= 24 Persei =

Aging giant in the constellation Perseus

- Location of 24 Persei (circled)

Observation data Epoch J2000 Equinox ICRS
- Constellation: Perseus
- Right ascension: 02^{h} 59^{m} 03.67639^{s}
- Declination: 35° 10′ 59.2865″
- Apparent magnitude (V): 4.94

Characteristics
- Spectral type: K2III
- U−B color index: +1.28
- B−V color index: +1.25

Astrometry
Radial velocity (R_{v})	−36.97 km/s
Proper motion (μ)	RA: −45.920 mas/yr Dec.: +5.632 mas/yr
Parallax (π)	9.6661±0.1963 mas
Distance	337 ± 7 ly (103 ± 2 pc)
Absolute magnitude (M_{V})	-0.32

Details
Mass	1.59 M_{☉}
Radius	23.56 R_{☉}
Luminosity	185 L_{☉}
Surface gravity (log g)	1.91 cgs
Temperature	4,391 K
Metallicity [Fe/H]	−0.07 dex
Rotational velocity (v sin i)	< 1.9 km/s

Other designations
- 24 Per, BD+34°550, FK5 1082, GC 3575, HD 18449, HIP 13905, HR 882, SAO 56052

Database references
SIMBAD	data

24 Persei is a star in the northern constellation of Perseus, located around 337 light years from the Sun. It is visible to the naked eye as a faint, orange-hued star with an apparent visual magnitude of 4.94. The object is moving closer to the Earth with a heliocentric radial velocity of −37 km/s.

This is an aging giant star with a stellar classification of K2 III, which indicates it has exhausted the hydrogen at its core and evolved away from the main sequence. It has 1.59 times the mass of the Sun and has expanded to about 24 times the Sun's radius. The star is radiating 185 times the Sun's luminosity from its enlarged photosphere at an effective temperature of 4,391 K.
