= 20 Persei =

Star in the constellation Perseus

Observation data Epoch J2000 Equinox ICRS
- Constellation: Perseus
- Right ascension: 02^{h} 53^{m} 42.61284^{s}
- Declination: +38° 20′ 14.9532″
- Apparent magnitude (V): 5.343

Characteristics
- Evolutionary stage: main sequence
- Spectral type: F6V
- U−B color index: +0.03
- B−V color index: +0.42

Astrometry
Radial velocity (R_{v})	5.8 ± 2 km/s
Proper motion (μ)	RA: 46.79 mas/yr Dec.: -78.90 mas/yr
Parallax (π)	14.15±0.72 mas
Distance	230 ± 10 ly (71 ± 4 pc)

Orbit
Period (P)	31.633 ± 0.024 a (11,553.9 ± 8.7 d)
Semi-major axis (a)	0.2224 ± 0.0011″
Eccentricity (e)	0.7560 ±0.0023
Inclination (i)	120.48 ± 0.20°
Longitude of the node (Ω)	26.62 ± 0.24°
Periastron epoch (T)	2450255.5 ± 12
Argument of periastron (ω) (secondary)	265.54 ± 0.11°

Details

20 Per A
Mass	1.5 M_{☉}

20 Per A
Mass	1.5 M_{☉}

Other designations
- 20 Per, BD+37° 655, HD 17904, HIP 13490, HR 855, SAO 55975, WDS J02537+3820

Database references
SIMBAD	data

20 Persei is a visual binary star in the northern constellation of Perseus, a few degrees from Pi Persei. It is visible to the naked eye as a dim, yellow-white hued point of light with a combined apparent visual magnitude of 5.343. The system is located around 230 light-years (71 pc) away from the Sun, based on its parallax. It is receding from the Earth with a heliocentric radial velocity of +6 km/s.

The orbit of the two stars has been calculated from the secondary changing its position relative to the primary. The two orbit each other every 31.6 years with an angular semimajor axis of 0.22 arcseconds and an eccentricity of 0.7560. The combined spectrum of 20 Persei matches that of an F-type main-sequence star, and the two stars are thought to have equal masses, 1.5 times that of the Sun. A ninth-magnitude star, designated 20 Persei C, may be associated with the pair.
