= 11 Persei =

Star in the constellation Perseus

Observation data Epoch J2000.0 Equinox J2000.0 (ICRS)
- Constellation: Perseus
- Right ascension: 02^{h} 43^{m} 02.83826^{s}
- Declination: +55° 06′ 21.6700″
- Apparent magnitude (V): 5.76

Characteristics
- Evolutionary stage: main sequence
- Spectral type: B7 III(p?) (Hg?)
- B−V color index: −0.110±0.003

Astrometry
| Radial velocity (R_{v}) | −0.7±1.0 km/s |
| Proper motion (μ) | RA: +34.859 mas/yr Dec.: −21.955 mas/yr |
| Parallax (π) | 7.8022±0.0874 mas |
| Distance | 418 ± 5 ly (128 ± 1 pc) |
| Absolute magnitude (M_{V}) | 0.16 |

Details
| Mass | 3.77±0.06 M_{☉} |
| Radius | 3.2 R_{☉} |
| Luminosity | 210.4+21.9 −19.9 L_{☉} |
| Surface gravity (log g) | 4.19 cgs |
| Temperature | 14,550 K |
| Metallicity [Fe/H] | +0.09 dex |
| Rotation | 25–70 d |
| Rotational velocity (v sin i) | 4.50 km/s |
| Age | 50.9±12.2 Myr |

Other designations
- 11 Per, BD+54°598, FK5 2188, HD 16727, HIP 12692, HR 785, SAO 23555

Database references
| SIMBAD | data |

11 Persei is a single star in the constellation of Perseus, located about 418 light years away from the Sun. It is visible to the naked eye as a dim, blue-white hued star with an apparent visual magnitude of 5.76.

This is a chemically peculiar mercury-manganese star. Cowley (1972) found a stellar classification of B7 III(p?) (Hg?), while Hube (1970) had B8 IV, and Appenzeller (1967) showed B6 V. Stellar models indicate this is a young B-type main sequence star with an estimated age of around 51 million years. It has a low rotation rate, showing a projected rotational velocity of 4.50 km/s. The star has 3.8 times the mass of the Sun and is radiating 210 times the Sun's luminosity from its photosphere at an effective temperature of 14,550 K.
