= V718 Persei =

Star in the constellation Perseus

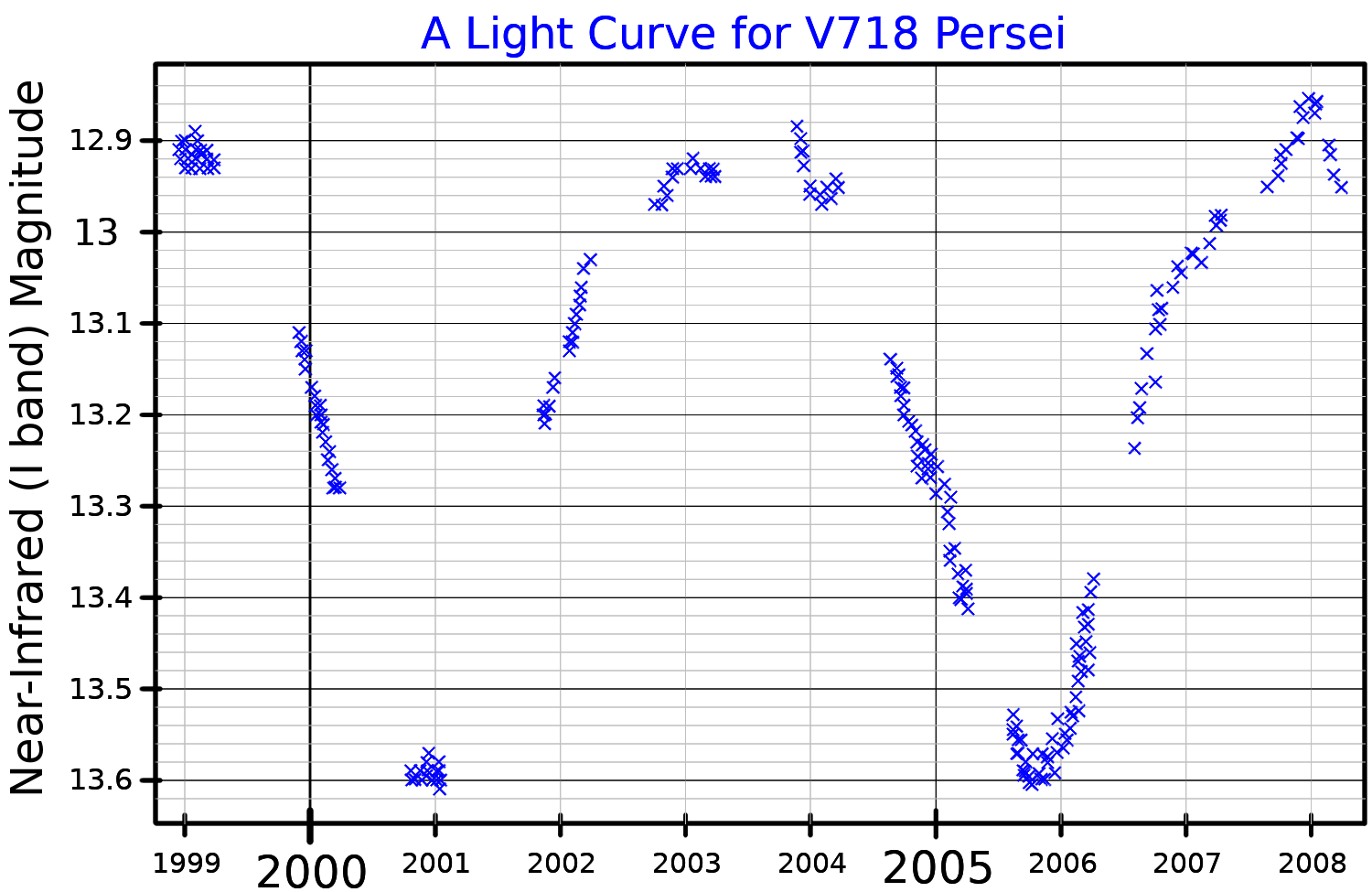
- A near-infrared (I band) light curve for V718 Persei, adapted from Grinin et al. (2008)

Observation data Epoch J2000.0 Equinox ICRS
- Constellation: Perseus
- Right ascension: 03^{h} 44^{m} 39.241^{s}
- Declination: +32° 07′ 35.52″
- Apparent magnitude (V): 15.82

Characteristics
- Spectral type: K3V
- Variable type: Eclipsing system

Astrometry
Distance	≈1043 ly (≈320 pc)

Details
Mass	1.6 M_{☉}
Radius	≈2.3 R_{☉}
Luminosity	3.4 L_{☉}
Temperature	5100-5350 K
Age	5 million years

Other designations
- V718 Per, CXOPZ J034439.2+320736, CXOPZ 153, 2MASS J03443924+320735

Database references
SIMBAD	data

V718 Persei is a young star in the constellation of Perseus, located in the young open cluster IC 348. The star has several designations derived from the cluster in which it belongs (H 187, TJ 108, HMW 15, LRL 35, NTC 5401, LNB 90—all require the prefix "IC 348"). The star shows hints of an occulting body of unclear nature, likely planetary.

== A planetary system? ==
In 2008 Grinin et al. invoke the possible presence of a substellar object to explain peculiar and periodic eclipses occurring to the young star every 4.7 years. The presence of a planetary object is still invoked in a recent research. They infer a maximum mass of 6 times that of Jupiter for the perturbing object and an orbital separation of 3.3 astronomical units.

The V718 Persei planetary system
Companion (in order from star)	Mass	Semimajor axis (AU)	Orbital period (days)	Eccentricity	Inclination (°)	Radius
b (unconfirmed)	≤6 M_{J}	3.3	1715.5	0	—	—
