= HD 20468 =

K-type bright giant star in the constellation Perseus

- Location of HD 20468 (circled)

Observation data Epoch J2000 Equinox ICRS
- Constellation: Perseus
- Right ascension: 03^{h} 18^{m} 43.82583^{s}
- Declination: +34° 13′ 21.5473″
- Apparent magnitude (V): 4.82

Characteristics
- Spectral type: K2IICN1
- U−B color index: +1.55
- B−V color index: +1.49

Astrometry
Radial velocity (R_{v})	+1.80 km/s
Proper motion (μ)	RA: +2.75 mas/yr Dec.: -8.87 mas/yr
Parallax (π)	2.77±0.23 mas
Distance	1,180 ± 100 ly (360 ± 30 pc)
Absolute magnitude (M_{V})	-2.92

Details
Mass	7.0 M_{☉}
Luminosity	3512 L_{☉}
Surface gravity (log g)	1.09 cgs
Temperature	4,369 K
Metallicity [Fe/H]	+0.03 dex
Rotational velocity (v sin i)	5.9 km/s

Other designations
- BD+33°619, FK5 2232, GC 3948, HIP 15416, HR 991, HD 20468, SAO 56340

Database references
SIMBAD	data

HD 20468 is a class K2II (orange bright giant) star in the constellation Perseus. Its apparent magnitude is 4.82 and it is approximately 1180 light years away based on parallax.
