= 59 Persei =

Star in the constellation Perseus

Observation data Epoch J2000 Equinox ICRS
- Constellation: Perseus
- Right ascension: 04^{h} 42^{m} 54.33987^{s}
- Declination: +43° 21′ 54.4795″
- Apparent magnitude (V): 5.30

Characteristics
- Evolutionary stage: main sequence
- Spectral type: A1Vn
- B−V color index: 0.028±0.005

Astrometry
Radial velocity (R_{v})	+13.2±3.1 km/s
Proper motion (μ)	RA: +30.826 mas/yr Dec.: −50.576 mas/yr
Parallax (π)	12.7294±0.1774 mas
Distance	256 ± 4 ly (79 ± 1 pc)
Absolute magnitude (M_{V})	0.99

Details
Mass	2.58 M_{☉}
Radius	2.5 R_{☉}
Luminosity	41.4+11.7 −9.2 L_{☉}
Surface gravity (log g)	4.05±0.14 cgs
Temperature	10,734±365 K
Rotational velocity (v sin i)	212 km/s
Age	198 Myr

Other designations
- 59 Per, BD+43°1043, GC 5719, HD 29722, HIP 21928, HR 1494, SAO 39699

Database references
SIMBAD	data

59 Persei is a suspected astrometric binary star system in the northern constellation of Perseus. It is visible to the naked eye as a dim, white-hued star with an apparent magnitude of 5.30. The star is located around 256 light years distant from the Sun, based on parallax, and is drifting further away with a radial velocity of +13 km/s.

This is an ordinary A-type main-sequence star with a stellar classification of A1Vn, a star that is fusing its core hydrogen. The 'n' suffix indicates "nebulous" lines due to rapid spin; it has a projected rotational velocity of 212 km/s. The star is around 198 million years old with 2.58 times the mass of the Sun and about 2.5 times the Sun's radius. It is radiating 41 times the luminosity of the Sun from its photosphere at an effective temperature of 10,734 K.
