= Theta Persei =

Star system in the constellation Perseus

θ Persei
- Location of θ Persei (circled)

Observation data Epoch J2000 Equinox ICRS
- Constellation: Perseus
- Right ascension: 02^{h} 44^{m} 11.98704^{s}
- Declination: +49° 13′ 42.4111″
- Apparent magnitude (V): 4.11 / 9.987

Characteristics

θ Per A
- Evolutionary stage: Main sequence
- Spectral type: F8 V
- U−B color index: +0.00
- B−V color index: +0.49

θ Per B
- Spectral type: M1.5 V
- B−V color index: +1.48

Astrometry
Radial velocity (R_{v})	+24.32 km/s
Proper motion (μ)	RA: +334.66 mas/yr Dec.: -89.99 mas/yr
Parallax (π)	89.87±0.22 mas
Distance	36.29 ± 0.09 ly (11.13 ± 0.03 pc)
Absolute magnitude (M_{V})	3.88

Orbit
Period (P)	2,720 yr
Semi-major axis (a)	22.289″
Eccentricity (e)	0.13
Inclination (i)	75.44°
Longitude of the node (Ω)	128°
Periastron epoch (T)	B 1613
Argument of periastron (ω) (secondary)	100.64°

Details

θ Per A
Mass	1.138±0.010 M_{☉}
Radius	1.319±0.011 R_{☉}
Luminosity	2.235±0.040 L_{☉}
Surface gravity (log g)	4.43±0.17 cgs
Temperature	6,328±86 K
Metallicity [Fe/H]	−0.03±0.09 dex
Age	4.0±0.4 Gyr

θ Per B
Mass	0.521±0.052 M_{☉}
Radius	0.498±0.017 R_{☉}
Temperature	3,685±60 K
Metallicity [Fe/H]	−0.03±0.09 dex
Age	2.4 Gyr

Other designations
- θ Per, BD+48°746, GJ 107, CCDM J02441+4913, IDS 02374+4848, WDS J02442+4914
- θ Per A: 13 Persei, HR 799, HD 16895, HIP 12777, FK5 93, GC 3277, PPM 45428, SAO 38288
- θ Per B: 2MASS J02441025+4913540

Database references
SIMBAD	θ Per
- θ Per A
- θ Per B

Theta Persei (Theta Per, θ Persei, θ Per) is a star system 37 light years away from Earth, in the constellation Perseus. It is one of the closest naked-eye stars.

The primary star is a yellowish dwarf (main sequence) star of spectral type F8V, which is somewhat larger and brighter than the Sun but still within the range considered to have the potential for Earth-like planets. There is also a red dwarf companion of spectral type M1.V, orbiting about 250 AU from the primary. It has a Gaia Data Release 2 parallax of 89.2871±0.1534 mas, corresponding to a distance of 11.2 pc.

An 11th-magnitude star is listed in double-star catalogs as component C of the multiple system. It was 95″ away from component A in 2002, although the separation is rapidly increasing as it is a distant background object with a very different proper motion to the other two stars. An unconfirmed companion, possibly a brown dwarf, was reported 6.2″ from θ Persei B in 2010.
