= 3 Persei =

Star in the constellation Perseus

Observation data Epoch J2000 Equinox ICRS
- Constellation: Perseus
- Right ascension: 01^{h} 58^{m} 33.50596^{s}
- Declination: +49° 12′ 15.6705″
- Apparent magnitude (V): 5.70

Characteristics
- Evolutionary stage: red giant branch
- Spectral type: K0 IV

Astrometry
Radial velocity (R_{v})	−0.67±0.17 km/s
Proper motion (μ)	RA: +7.051 mas/yr Dec.: +41.686 mas/yr
Parallax (π)	12.6940±0.0671 mas
Distance	257 ± 1 ly (78.8 ± 0.4 pc)
Absolute magnitude (M_{V})	1.33

Details
Mass	1.41±0.17 M_{☉}
Radius	8.27±0.55 R_{☉}
Luminosity	37.2+7.5 −6.3 L_{☉}
Surface gravity (log g)	2.72±0.09 cgs
Temperature	4,757±25 K
Metallicity [Fe/H]	−0.15±0.05 dex
Rotational velocity (v sin i)	1.85±0.45 km/s
Age	2.91±0.98 Gyr

Other designations
- 3 Per, BD+48°576, HD 11949, HIP 9222, HR 568, SAO 37665

Database references
SIMBAD	data

3 Persei is a single, orange-hued star in the northern constellation of Perseus. It is dimly visible to the naked eye under good viewing conditions, having an apparent visual magnitude of 5.70 The star is located around 79 parsecs (257 ly) distant, based upon an annual parallax shift of 12.7 mas.

This star has a stellar classification of K0 IV, suggesting it is a K-type subgiant – an evolved star that has used up its core hydrogen and is evolving to become a red giant. However, da Silva et al. (2015) categorized it as a giant star proper. At the age of around three billion years, it has an estimated 1.4 times the mass of the Sun and has expanded to move than 8 times the Sun's radius. It is radiating roughly 37 times the Sun's luminosity from its enlarged photosphere at an effective temperature of 4,757 K.
