= 55 Persei =

Star in the constellation Perseus

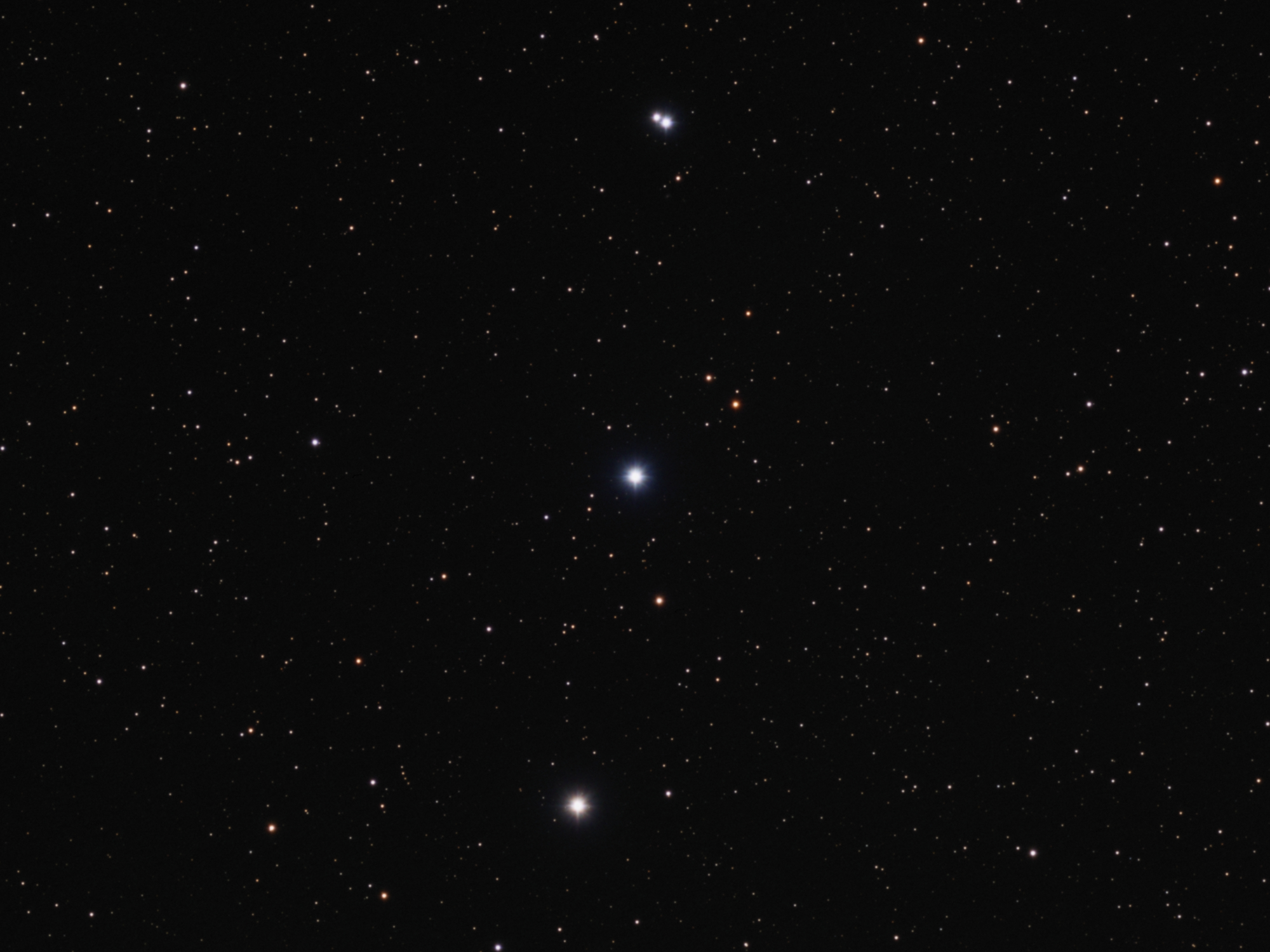
- 55 Persei in optical light

Observation data Epoch J2000 Equinox ICRS
- Constellation: Perseus
- Right ascension: 04^{h} 24^{m} 29.1556^{s}
- Declination: +34° 07′ 50.728″
- Apparent magnitude (V): 5.73

Characteristics
- Spectral type: B8 V
- B−V color index: −0.054±0.004

Astrometry
Radial velocity (R_{v})	+8.5±3.5 km/s
Proper motion (μ)	RA: +21.092 mas/yr Dec.: −34.137 mas/yr
Parallax (π)	8.50±0.38 mas
Distance	380 ± 20 ly (118 ± 5 pc)
Absolute magnitude (M_{V})	−0.39

Details
Mass	3.44±0.07 M_{☉}
Radius	3.0 R_{☉}
Luminosity	193+24 −21 L_{☉}
Temperature	12,246±85 K
Rotational velocity (v sin i)	288 km/s
Age	197 Myr

Other designations
- 55 Per, BD+33° 853, HD 27777, HIP 20579, HR 1377, SAO 57212

Database references
SIMBAD	data

55 Persei is a single, blue-white hued star in the northern constellation Perseus. It is faintly visible to the naked eye under good seeing conditions, having an apparent visual magnitude of 5.73. Based upon an annual parallax shift of 8.50±0.38 mas as seen from Earth's orbit, the star is located about 380 light years from the Sun. At that distance, the visual magnitude is diminished by an extinction of 0.39 due to interstellar dust.

This is a B-type main-sequence star with a stellar classification of B8 V; a massive star that is generating energy through hydrogen fusion at its core. It has 3.44 times the mass of the Sun and about 3 times the Sun's radius. The star is about 197 million years old and is spinning rapidly with a projected rotational velocity of 288 km/s. It is radiating roughly 193 times the Sun's luminosity from its photosphere at an effective temperature of 12,246 K.
