= 43 Persei =

Spectroscopic binary star system in the constellation Perseus

- Location of 43 Persei (circled)

Observation data Epoch J2000 Equinox ICRS
- Constellation: Perseus
- Right ascension: 03^{h} 56^{m} 36.52069^{s}
- Declination: +50° 41′ 43.3646″
- Apparent magnitude (V): 5.28

Characteristics
- Spectral type: F5V
- U−B color index: +0.00
- B−V color index: +0.41

Astrometry
Radial velocity (R_{v})	+25.43±0.04 km/s
Proper motion (μ)	RA: +92.450 mas/yr Dec.: -129.755 mas/yr
Parallax (π)	26.0059±0.1271 mas
Distance	126±0.65 ly (38.7±0.2 pc)
Absolute magnitude (M_{V})	2.23

Orbit
Period (P)	30.43885±0.00002 days
Semi-major axis (a)	6.99±0.06 mas
Eccentricity (e)	0.6421±0.0006
Longitude of the node (Ω)	150.2±0.3°
Periastron epoch (T)	57,340.551±0.003 JD
Argument of periastron (ω) (primary)	207.71±0.11°
Semi-amplitude (K_{1}) (primary)	52.24±0.06 km/s
Semi-amplitude (K_{2}) (secondary)	53.15±0.06 km/s

Details

43 Per Aa
Mass	1.434±0.014 M_{☉}
Radius	1.67±0.06 R_{☉}
Surface gravity (log g)	4.15±0.02 cgs
Temperature	6,790±120 K
Metallicity [Fe/H]	0.00 dex
Rotational velocity (v sin i)	14.1±0.9 km/s

43 Per Ab
Mass	1.409±0.014 M_{☉}
Radius	1.6±0.1 R_{☉}
Surface gravity (log g)	4.18±0.03 cgs
Temperature	6,770±90 K
Metallicity [Fe/H]	0.00 dex
Rotational velocity (v sin i)	10.6±1.7 km/s

Other designations
- A Persei, 43 Per, BD+50°860, GC 4728, HD 24546, HIP 18453, HR 1210, SAO 24314, CCDM J03566+5042AP, WDS J03566+5042AD

Database references
SIMBAD	data

43 Persei is a binary star system in the northern constellation Perseus. It is visible to the naked eye as a dim, yellow-white hued star with an apparent visual magnitude of 5.28. The system is located around 38.7 parsecs (126.2 ly) distant from the Sun, based on its dynamical parallax.

This is a double-lined spectroscopic binary with an orbital period of 30.4 days and an eccentricity of 0.6. It has also been spatially resolved with interferometry at the CHARA array. There are distant companions B (separation 75.5" and magnitude 10.66), C (separation 85.6" and magnitude 12.18), and D (separation 68" and magnitude 13.43).
