= 54 Persei =

Star in the constellation Perseus

- Location of 54 Persei (circled)

Observation data Epoch J2000 Equinox ICRS
- Constellation: Perseus
- Right ascension: 04^{h} 20^{m} 24.63885^{s}
- Declination: 34° 34′ 00.2033″
- Apparent magnitude (V): 4.93

Characteristics
- Spectral type: G8+ IIIb
- U−B color index: +0.69
- B−V color index: +0.95

Astrometry
Radial velocity (R_{v})	−26.82 km/s
Proper motion (μ)	RA: −25.046 mas/yr Dec.: −6.420 mas/yr
Parallax (π)	14.8484±0.1993 mas
Distance	220 ± 3 ly (67.3 ± 0.9 pc)
Absolute magnitude (M_{V})	0.80

Details
Mass	2.57±0.10 M_{☉}
Radius	9.37±0.22 R_{☉}
Luminosity	50.7±2.0 L_{☉}
Surface gravity (log g)	2.93±0.03 cgs
Temperature	5,036±32 K
Metallicity [Fe/H]	+0.11±0.10 dex
Rotational velocity (v sin i)	1.8 km/s
Age	580±90 Myr

Other designations
- 54 Per, BD+34°860, FK5 158, GC 5235, HD 27348, HIP 20252, HR 1343, SAO 57171, CCDM J04204+3435A, WDS J04204+3434A

Database references
SIMBAD	data

54 Persei is a single star in the northern constellation of Perseus. It is visible to the naked eye as a faint, yellow-hued star with an apparent visual magnitude of 4.93. The star is located approximately 220 light years away based on parallax, but is drifting closer with a radial velocity of −27 km/s.

This is an aging giant star with a stellar classification of G8+ IIIb, a star that has exhausted the supply of hydrogen at its core and expanded to more than nine times the girth of the Sun. It is around 580 million years old with 2.6 times the mass of the Sun. The star is radiating 51 times the luminosity of the Sun from its enlarged photosphere at an effective temperature of 5,036 K. It has one distant visual companion, designated component B, at an angular separation of 93″ and magnitude 13.0.
