= 40 Persei =

Star in the constellation Perseus

- Location of 40 Persei (circled)

Observation data Epoch J2000 Equinox ICRS
- Constellation: Perseus
- Right ascension: 03^{h} 42^{m} 22.64555^{s}
- Declination: +33° 57′ 54.0893″
- Apparent magnitude (V): 4.97

Characteristics
- Spectral type: B0.5V + A1Vn
- U−B color index: −0.84
- B−V color index: +0.00

Astrometry
Radial velocity (R_{v})	+22.00 km/s
Proper motion (μ)	RA: +2.71 mas/yr Dec.: −5.91 mas/yr
Parallax (π)	3.09±0.21 mas
Distance	1,060 ± 70 ly (320 ± 20 pc)
Absolute magnitude (M_{V})	−2.26

Details

40 Per A
Mass	12.5 M_{☉}
Luminosity	936 L_{☉}
Surface gravity (log g)	4.36 cgs
Temperature	29,330 K
Metallicity [Fe/H]	−0.43 dex
Rotational velocity (v sin i)	10 km/s
Age	7.2 Myr

Other designations
- 40 Per, BD+33°698, GC 4420, HD 22951, HIP 17313, HR 1123, SAO 56646, CCDM J03424+3358A, WDS J03424+3358A

Database references
SIMBAD	data

40 Persei is a wide binary star system in the northern constellation of Perseus. It has the Bayer designation ο Persei, while 40 Persei is the Flamsteed designation. The system is visible to the naked eye as a faint, blue-white hued point of light with an apparent visual magnitude of 4.97. It is located approximately 1060 light years away from the Sun based on parallax, and is drifting further away with a radial velocity of +22 km/s. The system is a member of the Perseus OB2 association of co-moving stars.

The primary component is a massive B-type main-sequence star with a stellar classification of B0.5V. It is about 7.2 million years old and has a very low projected rotational velocity for an early B-type star, measured at 10 km/s. This star has 12.5 times the mass of the Sun and is radiating 936 times the Sun's luminosity from its photosphere at an effective temperature of 29,330 K. The companion is magnitude 10.04, A-type main-sequence star with a class of A1Vn, and is located at an angular separation of 19.8″ from the primary.
