= 58 Persei =

Multiple-star system in the constellation of Perseus

- Location of 58 Persei (circled)

Observation data Epoch J2000 Equinox ICRS
- Constellation: Perseus
- Right ascension: 04^{h} 36^{m} 41.43017^{s}
- Declination: +41° 15′ 53.3213″
- Apparent magnitude (V): 4.26

Characteristics
- Spectral type: K1II + B7V
- U−B color index: +0.81
- B−V color index: +1.24

Astrometry
Radial velocity (R_{v})	+9.80 km/s
Proper motion (μ)	RA: −4.56 mas/yr Dec.: −17.84 mas/yr
Parallax (π)	4.09±0.38 mas
Distance	800 ± 70 ly (240 ± 20 pc)
Absolute magnitude (M_{V})	-2.67

Orbit
Primary	58 Persei A
Name	58 Persei B
Period (P)	28.8 yr
Semi-major axis (a)	0.051″
Eccentricity (e)	0.64
Inclination (i)	81°
Longitude of the node (Ω)	237°
Periastron epoch (T)	1978.65
Argument of periastron (ω) (secondary)	191°

Details

58 Per A
Mass	6.8±0.2 M_{☉}
Radius	86.7+4.6 −5.1 R_{☉}
Luminosity	1,731±323 L_{☉}
Surface gravity (log g)	2.21 cgs
Temperature	4,500 K
Metallicity [Fe/H]	−0.20 dex
Rotational velocity (v sin i)	11.0 km/s
Age	50.1±6.8 Myr

Other designations
- Boss 1074, 58 Per, BD+40°1000, FK5 2338, GC 5609, HD 29094–95, HIP 21476, HR 1454, SAO 39639, CCDM J04367+4116A

Database references
SIMBAD	data

58 Persei is a binary and possibly a triple star system in the northern constellation of Perseus. It has the Bayer designation e Persei, while 58 Persei is the Flamsteed designation. This system is visible to the naked eye as a faint point of light with an apparent visual magnitude of 4.26. It is approximately 800 light years away from the Sun based on parallax, and is drifting further away with a radial velocity of +10 km/s.

This is a single-lined spectroscopic binary system with an orbital period of 28.7 years and an eccentricity of 0.65. The primary member, designated component A, is an orange-hued (K–type) bright giant with a stellar classification of K1II. The star is around 50 million years old with 6.8 times the mass of the Sun. Having exhausted the supply of hydrogen at its core, it has expanded to roughly 87 times the Sun's radius. It is radiating 1,731 times the luminosity of the Sun from its enlarged photosphere at an effective temperature of 4,500 K.

The secondary, component B, appears to be a B-type main-sequence star with a stellar classification of B7V. It is a suspected binary of unknown period with component masses of 3.3 and 1.2 times the mass of the Sun.
