= 21 Persei =

Star in the constellation Perseus

- Location of 21 Persei (circled)

Observation data Epoch J2000 Equinox ICRS
- Constellation: Perseus
- Right ascension: 02^{h} 57^{m} 17.28172^{s}
- Declination: 31° 56′ 03.1935″
- Apparent magnitude (V): 5.10

Characteristics
- Evolutionary stage: main sequence
- Spectral type: A2VspSiEu
- U−B color index: −0.24
- B−V color index: −0.01
- Variable type: α² CVn

Astrometry
Radial velocity (R_{v})	+8.50 km/s
Proper motion (μ)	RA: +1.790 mas/yr Dec.: −30.088 mas/yr
Parallax (π)	9.3448±0.1319 mas
Distance	349 ± 5 ly (107 ± 2 pc)
Absolute magnitude (M_{V})	0.14

Details
Mass	3.57 M_{☉}
Luminosity	88.65 L_{☉}
Surface gravity (log g)	4.05 cgs
Temperature	12,585 K
Metallicity [Fe/H]	+0.90 dex
Rotational velocity (v sin i)	20 km/s

Other designations
- 21 Per, LT Per, BD+31°509, FK5 2205, GC 3544, HD 18296, HIP 13775, HR 873, SAO 56031

Database references
SIMBAD	data

21 Persei is a single, variable star in the northern constellation of Perseus, located about 331 light years away from the Sun. It is visible to the naked eye as a faint, white-hued star with an apparent visual magnitude of 5.10 km/s. The object is moving further from the Earth with a heliocentric radial velocity of +8.5 km/s. It has the variable star designation LT Persei; 21 Persei is the Flamsteed designation.

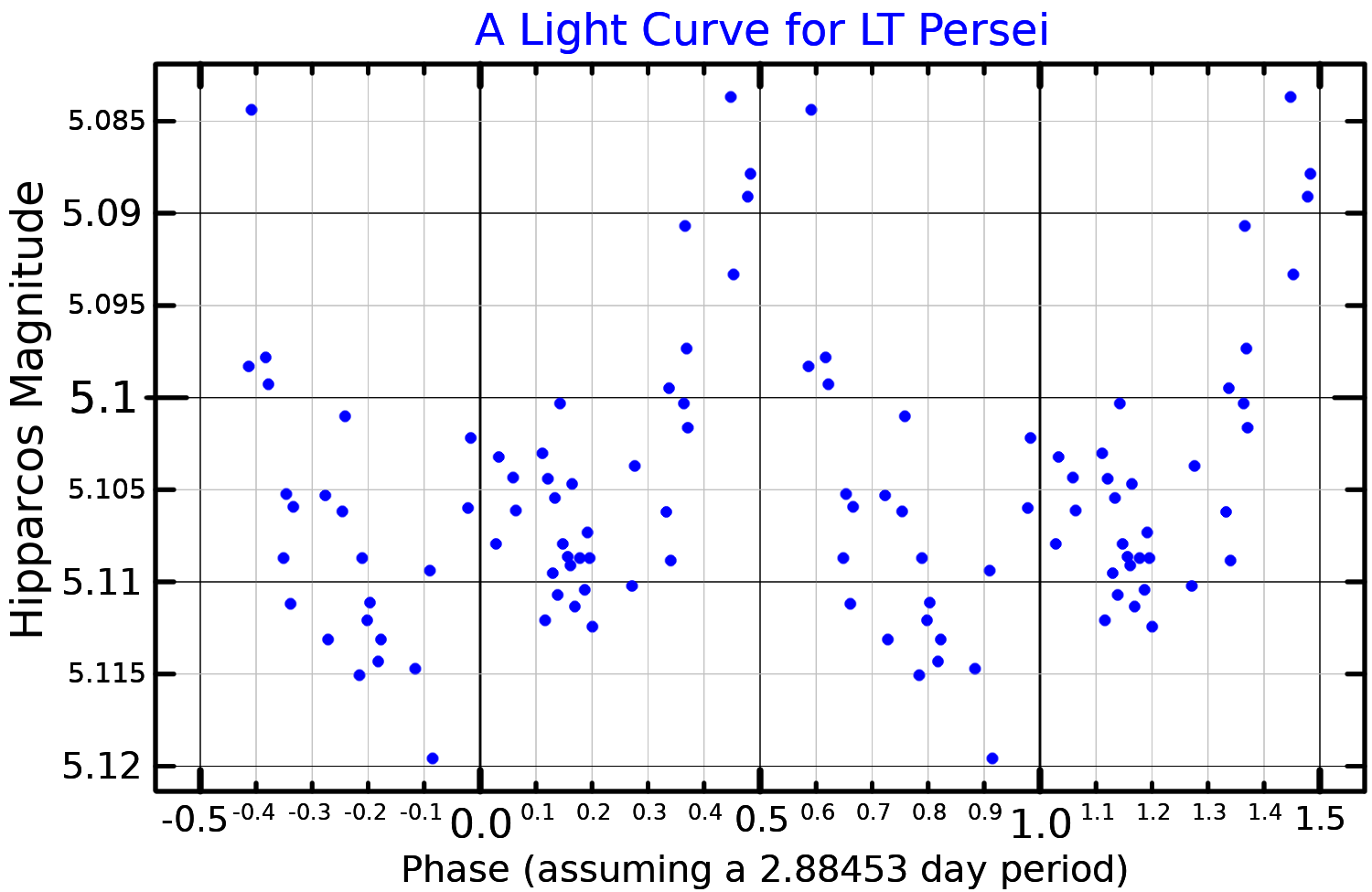
A light curve for LT Persei, plotted from Hipparcos data

This is an Ap star with a stellar classification of A2VspSiEu, where the A2V indicates it is an A-type main-sequence star, 's' means narrow "sharp" absorption, and SiEu shows abundance anomalies of the elements silicon and europium. The star is an Alpha^{2} Canum Venaticorum variable, meaning that the star has a strong magnetic field chromium, silicon, and strontium spectral lines. 21 Persei's period of variability is approximately 2.88 days.
