= 57 Persei =

Star in the constellation Perseus

Observation data Epoch J2000 Equinox ICRS
- Constellation: Perseus
- Right ascension: 04^{h} 33^{m} 24.90304^{s}
- Declination: +43° 03′ 50.0154″
- Apparent magnitude (V): 6.078

Characteristics
- Spectral type: F0 V
- U−B color index: +0.01
- B−V color index: +0.38

Astrometry
Radial velocity (R_{v})	−23.0±4.3 km/s
Proper motion (μ)	RA: +5.370 mas/yr Dec.: +5.531 mas/yr
Parallax (π)	16.3759±0.0181 mas
Distance	199.2 ± 0.2 ly (61.07 ± 0.07 pc)
Absolute magnitude (M_{V})	+2.23

Details
Mass	1.28 M_{☉}
Radius	2.6 R_{☉}
Luminosity	11.0 L_{☉}
Surface gravity (log g)	3.87 cgs
Temperature	6,615±225 K
Metallicity [Fe/H]	−0.19 dex
Rotational velocity (v sin i)	90 km/s
Age	1.614 Gyr

Other designations
- m Per, 57 Per, BD+42°990, FK5 1124, HD 28704, HIP 21242, HR 1434, SAO 39604, WDS J04334+4304A

Database references
SIMBAD	data

57 Persei, or m Persei, is a suspected triple star system in the northern constellation of Perseus. It is at the lower limit of visibility to the naked eye, having a combined apparent visual magnitude of 6.08. The annual parallax shift of 16.4 mas provides a distance measure of 199 light years. 57 Persei is moving closer to the Sun with a radial velocity of about −23 km/s and will make perihelion in around 2.6 million years at a distance of roughly 22 ly (6.6 pc).

The primary member, 57 Persei, is a magnitude 6.18, yellow-white hued F-type main-sequence star with a stellar classification of F0 V, indicating it is generating energy by fusing its core hydrogen. It is an estimated 1.6 billion years old and is spinning with a projected rotational velocity of 90 km/s. The star has 1.3 times the mass of the Sun and is radiating 11 times the Sun's luminosity from its photosphere at an effective temperature of around 6,615 K.

An unseen companion has been identified via slight changes to the proper motion of the primary. The third possible member of the system, designated component B, is a magnitude 6.87 F-type star at an angular separation of 120.13 arc seconds. This star has a different parallax and space velocity than the primary, so it may just be a wide visual companion. There are three other nearby visual companions that are not physically associated with the 57 Persei system.
