= 36 Persei =

Star in the constellation Perseus

- Location of 36 Persei (circled)

Observation data Epoch J2000 Equinox ICRS
- Constellation: Perseus
- Right ascension: 03^{h} 32^{m} 26.25926^{s}
- Declination: 46° 03′ 24.7016″
- Apparent magnitude (V): 5.32

Characteristics
- Evolutionary stage: main sequence
- Spectral type: F4III
- U−B color index: −0.02
- B−V color index: +0.41

Astrometry
Radial velocity (R_{v})	−47.5 km/s
Proper motion (μ)	RA: −53.125 mas/yr Dec.: −74.839 mas/yr
Parallax (π)	26.0579±0.0776 mas
Distance	125.2 ± 0.4 ly (38.4 ± 0.1 pc)
Absolute magnitude (M_{V})	2.50

Details
Mass	1.40 M_{☉}
Radius	2.17 R_{☉}
Luminosity	8.3 L_{☉}
Surface gravity (log g)	3.91 cgs
Temperature	6,655 K
Metallicity [Fe/H]	0.05 dex
Rotational velocity (v sin i)	28.0 km/s
Age	1.81 Gyr

Other designations
- 36 Per, NSV 1182, BD+45°778, FK5 2249, GC 4210, HD 21770, HIP 16499, HR 1069, SAO 38924

Database references
SIMBAD	data

36 Persei is a solitary, variable star located 121 light years away from the Sun in the northern constellation of Perseus. It is visible to the naked eye as a dim, yellow-white hued point of light with a baseline apparent visual magnitude of 5.32. The star is drifting closer to the Sun with a heliocentric radial velocity of −47.5 km/s, and may come as close as 36.6 light-years in 661,000 years.

The stellar classification of 36 Persei is F4III, matching an aging giant star that has used up its core hydrogen. This object is used by astronomers as a spectral standard for stars with a similar class. The star is a suspected variable of unknown type, ranging in visual magnitude from 5.29 down to 5.33, and is a source of X-ray emission. The star is 1.8 billion years old with a projected rotational velocity of 28 km/s. It has an estimated 1.4 times the mass of the Sun and has not yet expanded significantly, having 2.2 times the Sun's girth. The star is radiating 8.3 times the luminosity of the Sun from its photosphere at an effective temperature of 6,655 K.
