= 2 Persei =

Star in the constellation Perseus

Observation data Epoch J2000 Equinox ICRS
- Constellation: Perseus
- Right ascension: 01^{h} 52^{m} 09.3723^{s}
- Declination: +50° 47′ 34.054″
- Apparent magnitude (V): 5.70

Characteristics
- Evolutionary stage: main sequence
- Spectral type: B9pHgMn
- B−V color index: −0.067±0.004

Astrometry
Radial velocity (R_{v})	11.4±0.2 km/s
Proper motion (μ)	RA: +17.532 mas/yr Dec.: −29.090 mas/yr
Parallax (π)	6.8219±0.1092 mas
Distance	478 ± 8 ly (147 ± 2 pc)
Absolute magnitude (M_{V})	−0.14

Orbit
Primary	2 Persei A
Name	2 Persei B
Period (P)	5.62698±0.00002 d
Eccentricity (e)	0.024±0.011
Periastron epoch (T)	2440281.3±0.4 JD
Argument of periastron (ω) (primary)	208±24°
Semi-amplitude (K_{1}) (primary)	26.5±0.3 km/s

Details
Mass	3.199+0.024 −0.023 M_{☉}
Radius	3.72+0.88 −0.20 R_{☉}
Luminosity	156+60 −30 L_{☉}
Surface gravity (log g)	3.73+0.95 −0.21 cgs
Temperature	11,217+938 −101 K
Metallicity [Fe/H]	−0.74+0.05 −0.03 dex
Rotational velocity (v sin i)	25 km/s
Age	233+90 −70 Myr

Other designations
- BD+50°379, FK5 1052, HD 11291, HIP 8714, HR 536, SAO 22696

Database references
SIMBAD	data

2 Persei is a binary star system in the northern constellation Perseus, located around 500 light years away from the Sun. It is visible to the naked eye as a faint, blue-white hued star with an apparent visual magnitude is 5.70. The system is moving further away from the Earth with a heliocentric radial velocity of 11 km/s.

In 1970 radial velocity measurements from spectrograms taken at David Dunlap Observatory indicated it was a single-lined spectroscopic binary. Follow up observations led to the determination that it had a nearly circular orbit with a period of 5.6 days. The visible component is a chemically peculiar mercury-manganese star with a stellar classification of B9pHgMn. Other analyses of its spectrum have assigned it the giant star spectral type of B9III.
