= 8 Persei =

Star in the constellation Perseus

Observation data Epoch J2000.0 Equinox ICRS
- Constellation: Perseus
- Right ascension: 02^{h} 17^{m} 59.88750^{s}
- Declination: +57° 53′ 59.3529″
- Apparent magnitude (V): 5.757

Characteristics
- Spectral type: K3 III
- B−V color index: 1.203

Astrometry
| Radial velocity (R_{v}) | 0.72 km/s |
| Proper motion (μ) | RA: +60.568 mas/yr Dec.: +5.812 mas/yr |
| Parallax (π) | 7.8492±0.1017 mas |
| Distance | 416 ± 5 ly (127 ± 2 pc) |
| Absolute magnitude (M_{V}) | 0.26 |

Details
| Mass | 1.83 M_{☉} |
| Radius | 15.85±0.99 R_{☉} |
| Luminosity | 107.95±1.69 L_{☉} |
| Surface gravity (log g) | 2.3 cgs |
| Temperature | 4,560+92 −86 K |
| Metallicity [Fe/H] | −0.07 dex |
| Rotational velocity (v sin i) | 1.0 km/s |
| Age | 2.36 Gyr |

Other designations
- 8 Per, BD+57°535, FK5 2157, HD 13982, HIP 10718, HR 661, SAO 23143

Database references
| SIMBAD | data |

8 Persei is a single star in the northern constellation of Perseus, located 416 light years away from the Sun. It is visible to the naked eye as a dim, orange-hued star with an apparent visual magnitude of 5.757. There is an estimated 52% chance that the star may be a member of the Hyades–Pleiades stream of co-moving stars.

With an age of over two billion years, this is an aging red giant of spectral type K3 III, a star that has used up its core hydrogen and is expanding. It has 1.83 times the mass of the Sun and has reached nearly 16 times the Sun's size. The star is radiating 108 times the Sun's luminosity from its enlarged photosphere at an effective temperature of 4,560 K.
