= 49 Persei =

Star in the constellation Perseus

Observation data Epoch J2000 Equinox ICRS
- Constellation: Perseus
- Right ascension: 04^{h} 08^{m} 15.38813^{s}
- Declination: +37° 43′ 38.9875″
- Apparent magnitude (V): 6.07

Characteristics
- Spectral type: K1 III
- B−V color index: 0.943±0.003

Astrometry
Radial velocity (R_{v})	−44.35±0.20 km/s
Proper motion (μ)	RA: −98.909 mas/yr Dec.: −195.772 mas/yr
Parallax (π)	22.0897±0.0483 mas
Distance	147.7 ± 0.3 ly (45.27 ± 0.10 pc)
Absolute magnitude (M_{V})	2.85

Details
Mass	1.38 M_{☉}
Radius	3.72+0.10 −0.09 R_{☉}
Luminosity	7.95±0.03 L_{☉}
Surface gravity (log g)	3.45 cgs
Temperature	5,028+61 −70 K
Metallicity [Fe/H]	0.02±0.04 dex
Age	3.93 Gyr

Other designations
- 40 Per, BD+37°881, HD 25975, HIP 19302, HR 1277, SAO 57000

Database references
SIMBAD	data

49 Persei is a star in the northern constellation of Perseus. It is just visible to the naked eye as a dim, orange-hued star with an apparent visual magnitude of 6.09. Based upon parallax measurements, this star is located around 147.7 light-years (45.27 parsecs) away from the Sun, but is drifting closer with a radial velocity of −44 km/s. It has a relatively large proper motion, traversing the celestial sphere at a rate of 0.220″·yr^{−1}.

This is an aging red giant star with a stellar classification of K1III, a star that has used up its core hydrogen and is expanding. It is a candidate horizontal branch star, which would indicate it is past the red giant branch stage and is fusing helium at its core. The star is nearly four billion years old with 1.4 times the mass of the Sun and 3.7 times the Sun's radius. It is radiating eight times the luminosity of the Sun from its photosphere at an effective temperature of 5,028 K.
