= 42 Persei =

Binary star system in the constellation Perseus

- Location of 42 Persei (circled)

Observation data Epoch J2000 Equinox ICRS
- Constellation: Perseus
- Right ascension: 03^{h} 49^{m} 32.68952^{s}
- Declination: +33° 05′ 28.9603″
- Apparent magnitude (V): 5.05 - 5.18

Characteristics
- Spectral type: A3V + MV
- U−B color index: +0.11
- B−V color index: +0.07
- Variable type: Ellipsoidal

Astrometry
Radial velocity (R_{v})	−12.40 km/s
Proper motion (μ)	RA: −28.483 mas/yr Dec.: +6.260 mas/yr
Parallax (π)	10.8041±0.1504 mas
Distance	302 ± 4 ly (93 ± 1 pc)
Absolute magnitude (M_{V})	0.57

Orbit
Period (P)	1.7653511 ± 0.000002 d
Semi-major axis (a)	8.207 R_{☉}
Eccentricity (e)	0.056
Inclination (i)	65.3°
Argument of periastron (ω) (secondary)	257°
Semi-amplitude (K_{1}) (primary)	34.34 km/s

Details

42 Per A
Mass	2.0 M_{☉}
Radius	3.48 R_{☉}
Luminosity	59 L_{☉}
Surface gravity (log g)	3.78 cgs
Temperature	8,892 K
Metallicity [Fe/H]	0.00 dex
Rotational velocity (v sin i)	91 km/s

42 Per B
Mass	0.38 M_{☉}
Temperature	3,500 K

Other designations
- n Per, 42 Per, V467 Per, BD+32°667, GC 4592, HD 23848, HIP 17886, HR 1177, SAO 56727

Database references
SIMBAD	data

42 Persei is a binary star system in the northern constellation of Perseus. It has the Bayer designation n Persei, while 42 Persei is the Flamsteed designation. The system is visible to the naked eye as a dim, white-hued point of light with an apparent visual magnitude of 5.11. It is located around 93 parsecs (302 ly) distant from the Sun, but is drifting closer with a radial velocity of −12.4 km/s.

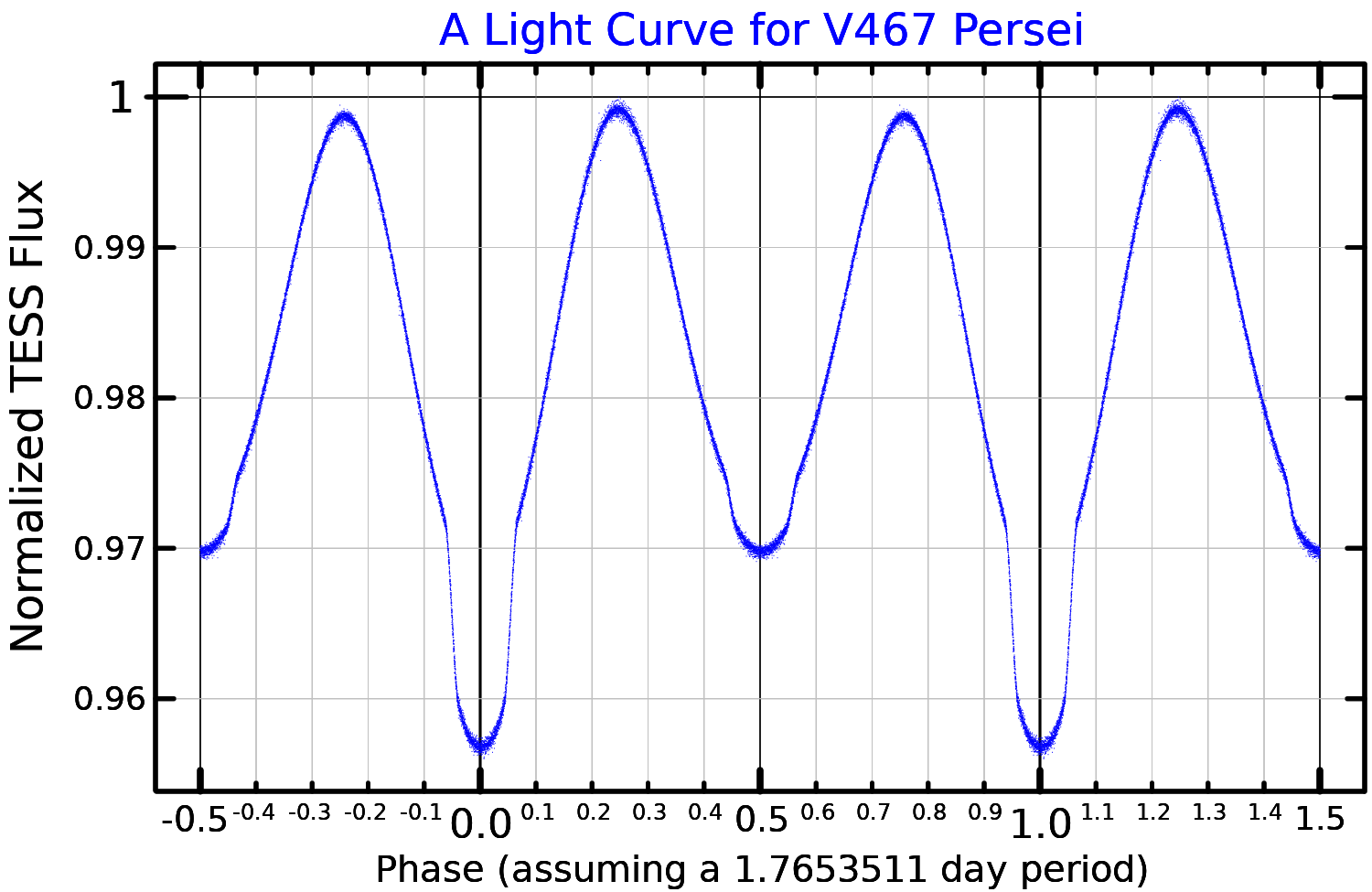
A light curve for V467 Persei, plotted from TESS data

42 Persei is a single-lined spectroscopic binary with an orbital period of 1.77 days and an eccentricity of just 0.056. It is a variable star, ranging in brightness from magnitude 5.05 to 5.18, and was assumed at discovery to be a close, but detached, eclipsing variable. Closer studies of the light variations and the orbit have shown that the main brightness changes are due to rotation of the distorted primary star, although it is predicted from the likely inclination of the orbit that shallow eclipses could also occur.

The visible component is an A-type main-sequence star with a stellar classification of A3V; a star that is fusing its core hydrogen. It has been reported as a mild Am star, but this is considered questionable. The star has twice the mass of the Sun and 3.5 times the Sun's radius. It has a high rate of spin, showing a projected rotational velocity of 91 km/s. The star is radiating 59 times the luminosity of the Sun from its photosphere at an effective temperature of 8,892 K. The unseen companion star is likely to be a dim red dwarf with 38% of the Sun's mass.

In Chinese astronomy, 42 Persei is called 天讒, Pinyin: Tiānchán, meaning Celestial Slander, because this star is marking itself and stand alone in Celestial Slander asterism, Hairy Head mansion (see : Chinese constellation).
