= 1 Persei =

Star in the constellation Perseus

- Location of 1 Persei (circled)

Observation data Epoch J2000.0 Equinox J2000.0
- Constellation: Perseus
- Right ascension: 01^{h} 51^{m} 59.32008^{s}
- Declination: +55° 08′ 50.5837″
- Apparent magnitude (V): 5.49 - 5.74 - 5.85

Characteristics
- Spectral type: B1.5V
- Variable type: eclipsing binary

Astrometry
Proper motion (μ)	RA: 12.716(74) mas/yr Dec.: −8.410(79) mas/yr
Parallax (π)	2.6944±0.0888 mas
Distance	1,210 ± 40 ly (370 ± 10 pc)
Absolute magnitude (M_{V})	−1.37/−1.77

Orbit
Primary	1 Persei A
Name	1 Persei B
Period (P)	25.935951±0.000003 d
Eccentricity (e)	0.3768±0.0014
Inclination (i)	88.048±0.002°
Periastron epoch (T)	2443563.466±0.005 HJD
Argument of periastron (ω) (secondary)	109.83±0.10°
Semi-amplitude (K_{1}) (primary)	97.4±0.1 km/s
Semi-amplitude (K_{2}) (secondary)	91.2±0.1 km/s

Details

Primary
Mass	6.95 M_{☉}
Radius	3.29 R_{☉}
Luminosity	2,188 L_{☉}
Surface gravity (log g)	4.25 cgs
Temperature	21,500 K
Rotation	1.45 days
Rotational velocity (v sin i)	115 km/s

Secondary
Mass	7.42 M_{☉}
Radius	3.86 R_{☉}
Luminosity	3,311 L_{☉}
Surface gravity (log g)	4.14 cgs
Temperature	22,000 K
Rotation	1.40 days
Rotational velocity (v sin i)	140 km/s

Other designations
- V436 Persei, BD+54 396, HD 11241, HIP 8704, HR 533, SAO 22690

Database references
SIMBAD	data

1 Persei (1 Per) is an eclipsing binary star in the constellation Perseus. Its uneclipsed apparent magnitude is 5.49. The binary star consists of two B2 type main-sequence stars in a 25.9 day eccentric orbit. The stars are surrounded by a faint cloud of gas visible in mid-infrared, although whether they are the origin of the gas or simply passing through it is unclear.

== Observational history ==
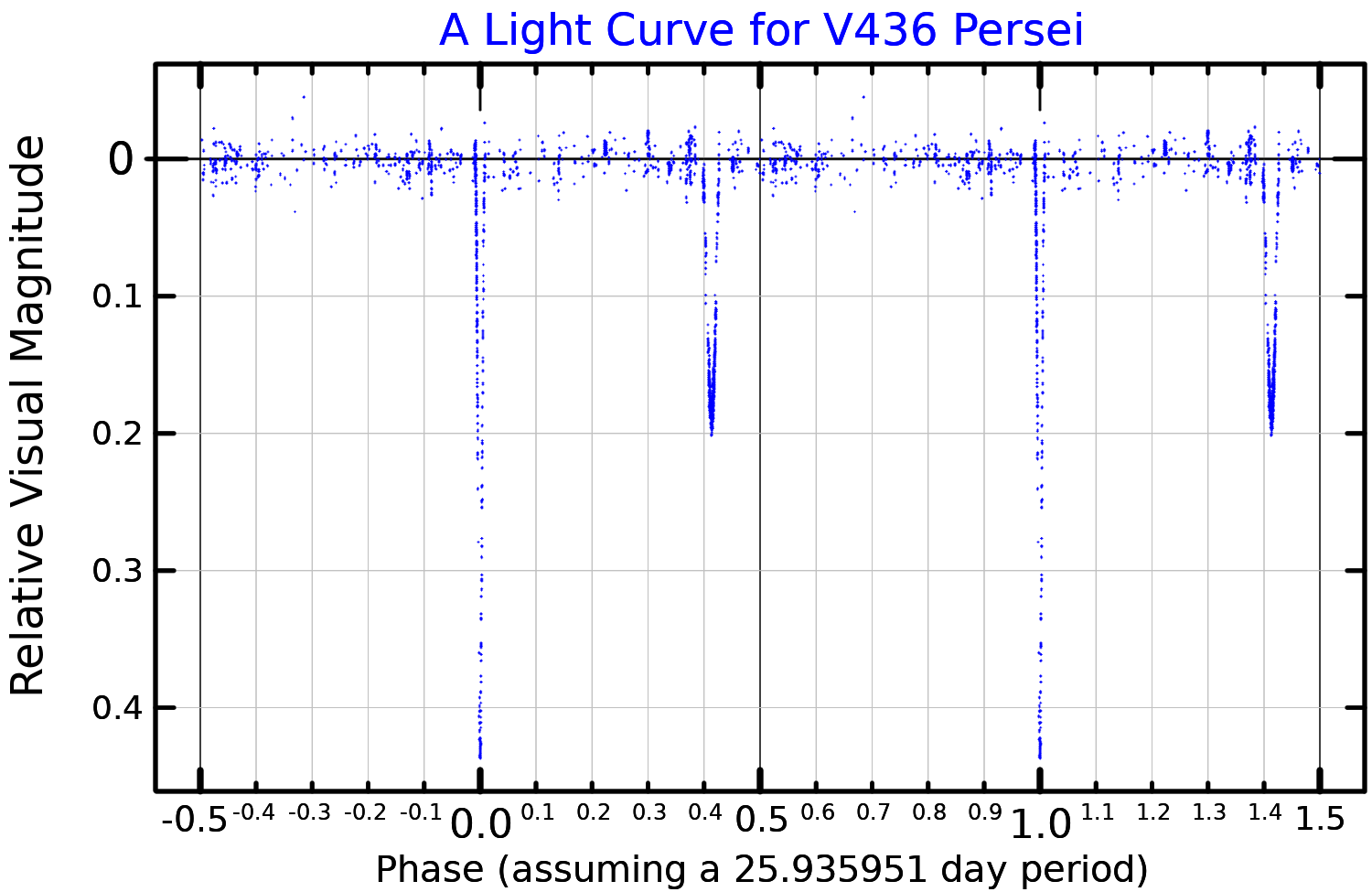
A visual band light curve for V436 Persei, adapted from Janik et al. (2003)

The possible eclipsing binary nature of 1 Persei was first noticed by Donald Kurtz in 1977 when it was used as a comparison star to test for photometric variability of HD 11408. In 1979 French amateur observers succeeded in determining an orbital period of 25.9 days. During the primary eclipse, the brightness drops to magnitude 5.85. In the secondary eclipses, the brightness drops to magnitude 5.74. The eclipses each last for approximately 25 hours.
