= 4 Persei =

Star in the constellation Perseus

- Location of 4 Persei (circled)

Observation data Epoch J2000 Equinox ICRS
- Constellation: Perseus
- Right ascension: 02^{h} 02^{m} 18.11081^{s}
- Declination: 54° 29′ 15.1488″
- Apparent magnitude (V): 5.04

Characteristics
- Spectral type: B8 III
- U−B color index: −0.32
- B−V color index: −0.08

Astrometry
Radial velocity (R_{v})	−2.30 km/s
Proper motion (μ)	RA: +32.886 mas/yr Dec.: −3.515 mas/yr
Parallax (π)	4.2743±0.1856 mas
Distance	760 ± 30 ly (230 ± 10 pc)
Absolute magnitude (M_{V})	−1.75

Details
Radius	3.2 R_{☉}
Luminosity	670 L_{☉}
Surface gravity (log g)	4.19 cgs
Temperature	12,230 K
Metallicity [Fe/H]	+0.30 dex
Rotational velocity (v sin i)	60 km/s

Other designations
- g Persei, 4 Per, BD+53°439, FK5 1054, GC 2442, HD 12303, HIP 9505, HR 590, SAO 22859

Database references
SIMBAD	data

4 Persei is a single star in the northern constellation of Perseus, located around 670 light years away from the Sun. It is visible to the naked eye as a faint, blue-white hued star with an apparent visual magnitude of 5.04 The Bayer designation for this star is g Persei; 4 Persei is the Flamsteed designation. This object has a peculiar velocity of 26.3 km/s and may be a runaway star.

The stellar classification for 4 Persei is B8 III, matching an aging B-type giant star that has evolved off the main sequence. It is spinning with a projected rotational velocity of 60 km/s and has about 3.2 times the Sun's radius The star is radiating 670 times the luminosity of the Sun from its photosphere at an effective temperature of 12,230 K. 4 Persei is embedded in a small, relatively dense dust cloud, which is resulting in infrared emission from the cold dust.
