= Omega Persei =

Star in the constellation Perseus

- Location of ω Persei (circled)

Observation data Epoch J2000.0 Equinox J2000.0 (ICRS)
- Constellation: Perseus
- Right ascension: 03^{h} 11^{m} 17.38161^{s}
- Declination: +39° 36′ 41.7014″
- Apparent magnitude (V): +4.614

Characteristics
- Evolutionary stage: red clump
- Spectral type: K0 III
- B−V color index: 1.122

Astrometry
Radial velocity (R_{v})	6.61 km/s
Proper motion (μ)	RA: −26.26 mas/yr Dec.: +5.40 mas/yr
Parallax (π)	11.32±0.23 mas
Distance	288 ± 6 ly (88 ± 2 pc)
Absolute magnitude (M_{V})	−0.234

Details
Mass	2.04 M_{☉}
Radius	19 R_{☉}
Luminosity	144.5 L_{☉}
Surface gravity (log g)	2.5 cgs
Temperature	4,586±18 K
Metallicity [Fe/H]	−0.10 dex
Rotational velocity (v sin i)	3.3 km/s
Age	1.65 Gyr

Other designations
- ω Per, 28 Persei, BD+39°724, FK5 2667, HD 19656, HIP 14817, HR 947, SAO 56224, WDS J03113+3937A

Database references
SIMBAD	data

Omega Persei (ω Persei) is a solitary, orange-hued star in the northern constellation of Perseus. The star is faintly visible to the naked eye with an apparent visual magnitude of +4.6. Based upon an annual parallax shift of 11.32 mas as seen from the Earth, the star is about 288 light years from the Sun.

ω Persei has the traditional name Gorgonea Quarta /ɡɔːrɡəˈniːə ˈkwɔːrtə/, being the fourth member of the quartet called the Gorgonea in reference to the Gorgons from the legend of Perseus.

This is an evolved K-type giant star with a stellar classification of K0 III. It is a red clump star that is generating energy via helium fusion at its core. At the estimated age of 1.65 billion years, Omega Persei has double times the mass of the Sun and has expanded to about 19 times the Sun's radius. It is radiating 144.5 times the Sun's luminosity from its photosphere at an effective temperature of 4,586 K.
