= 32 Persei =

Star in the constellation Perseus

- Location of 32 Persei (circled)

Observation data Epoch J2000 Equinox ICRS
- Constellation: Perseus
- Right ascension: 03^{h} 21^{m} 26.55723^{s}
- Declination: +43° 19′ 46.7414″
- Apparent magnitude (V): 4.96

Characteristics
- Evolutionary stage: main sequence
- Spectral type: A3V
- U−B color index: +0.07
- B−V color index: +0.04

Astrometry
Radial velocity (R_{v})	−9.00 km/s
Proper motion (μ)	RA: −59.947 mas/yr Dec.: −0.839 mas/yr
Parallax (π)	21.8865±0.2690 mas
Distance	149 ± 2 ly (45.7 ± 0.6 pc)
Absolute magnitude (M_{V})	1.64

Details
Mass	2.05 M_{☉}
Radius	1.8 R_{☉}
Luminosity	21 L_{☉}
Surface gravity (log g)	4.19 cgs
Temperature	8,872 K
Metallicity [Fe/H]	−0.01 dex
Rotational velocity (v sin i)	144 km/s
Age	125+75 −25 Myr

Other designations
- l Per, 32 Per, NSV 1107, BD+42°750, FK5 2236, GC 4004, HD 20677, HIP 15648, HR 1002, SAO 38750

Database references
SIMBAD	data

32 Persei is a single star located 149 light years away from the Sun in the northern constellation of Perseus. It has the Bayer designation of l Persei, while 32 Persei is the Flamsteed designation. This object is visible to the naked eye as a faint, white-hued star with an apparent visual magnitude of 4.96. It is moving closer to the Earth with a heliocentric radial velocity of −9 km/s, and is a member of the Sirius supercluster: a stream of stars that share a common motion through space.

This is an ordinary A-type main-sequence star with a stellar classification of A3V. It is around 125 million years old with a high rate of spin, showing a projected rotational velocity of 144 km/s. The star has double the mass of the Sun and 1.8 times the Sun's radius. It is radiating 21 times the luminosity of the Sun from its photosphere at an effective temperature of 8,872 K.
