= 17 Persei =

Star in the constellation Perseus

- Location of 17 Persei (circled)

Observation data Epoch J2000 Equinox ICRS
- Constellation: Perseus
- Right ascension: 02^{h} 51^{m} 30.83735^{s}
- Declination: 35° 03′ 35.0629″
- Apparent magnitude (V): 4.53

Characteristics
- Spectral type: K5+III
- U−B color index: +1.92
- B−V color index: +1.57
- Variable type: suspected

Astrometry
Radial velocity (R_{v})	+13.21 km/s
Proper motion (μ)	RA: +9.479 mas/yr Dec.: −62.744 mas/yr
Parallax (π)	7.7762±0.2018 mas
Distance	420 ± 10 ly (129 ± 3 pc)
Absolute magnitude (M_{V})	−1.21

Details
Mass	1.10±0.09 M_{☉}
Radius	60.16+3.58 −4.06 R_{☉}
Luminosity	848±115 L_{☉}
Surface gravity (log g)	0.93±0.06 cgs
Temperature	4,014±51 K
Metallicity [Fe/H]	−0.26 dex
Rotational velocity (v sin i)	1.6 km/s

Other designations
- NSV 963, BD+34°527, FK5 2198, GC 3419, HD 17709, HIP 13328, HR 843, SAO 55946

Database references
SIMBAD	data

17 Persei is a single star in the northern constellation of Perseus, located about 420 light years away from the Sun. It is visible to the naked eye as a faint, orange-hued star with an apparent visual magnitude of 4.53. This object is moving further from the Earth at a heliocentric radial velocity of +13 km/s.

Based upon a stellar classification of K5+III, this is an evolved giant star that has exhausted the hydrogen at its core. It is a suspected variable star, with an amplitude of 0.012 magnitude and period 4.4 days. The star has 1.1 times the mass of the Sun and has expanded to 60 times the Sun's radius. It is radiating 848 times the luminosity of the Sun from its enlarged photosphere at an effective temperature of 4,014 K.
