= 52 Persei =

Star in the constellation Perseus

- Location of 52 Persei (circled in red)

Observation data Epoch J2000 Equinox ICRS
- Constellation: Perseus
- Right ascension: 04^{h} 14^{m} 53.32924^{s}
- Declination: +40° 29′ 01.1973″
- Apparent magnitude (V): 4.68

Characteristics
- Spectral type: G5II + A2V
- B−V color index: 1.007±0.007

Astrometry
Radial velocity (R_{v})	−4.50±0.74 km/s
Proper motion (μ)	RA: +1.249 mas/yr Dec.: −30.506 mas/yr
Parallax (π)	5.4208±0.2593 mas
Distance	600 ± 30 ly (184 ± 9 pc)
Absolute magnitude (M_{V})	−1.6 / 1.1

Orbit
Period (P)	1576.44 days
Eccentricity (e)	0.41
Periastron epoch (T)	2,425,927.4 JD
Argument of periastron (ω) (secondary)	66.7°
Semi-amplitude (K_{1}) (primary)	18.1 km/s

Details

f Per A
Mass	4.0 M_{☉}
Radius	32.40+1.47 −0.83 R_{☉}
Luminosity	531.1±28.7 L_{☉}
Temperature	4868+64 −107 K

f Per B
Mass	2.4 M_{☉}
Temperature	10,232 K

Other designations
- f Per, 52 Per, BD+40°912, FK5 2306, GC 5103, HD 26673, HIP 19811, HR 1306, SAO 57000

Database references
SIMBAD	data

52 Persei is a suspected triple star system in the northern constellation of Perseus. It has the Bayer designation f Persei, while 52 Persei is the Flamsteed designation. The system is visible to the naked eye as a faint, yellow-hued point of light with an apparent visual magnitude of 4.68. It is located around 600 light years away from the Sun based on parallax, and is drifting closer with a radial velocity of −4.5 km/s.

The variable velocity of this system was reported by W. W. Campbell in 1918. It is a single-lined spectroscopic binary with an orbital period of 4.3 years and an eccentricity of 0.4. The components have a visual magnitude difference of 2.7 and are unresolved by speckle interferometry.

The primary component is an evolved bright giant star with a stellar classification of G5II. It has four times the mass of the Sun and has expanded to 32 times the Sun's radius. The star is radiating 531 times the luminosity of the Sun from its enlarged photosphere at an effective temperature of 4,868 K. The secondary is a suspected binary of unknown period, with its components having estimated masses equal to 2.4 and 1.0 times the mass of the Sun. The more massive member of the pair has an estimated spectral class of A2V, matching an A-type main-sequence star.
