= 30 Persei =

Star in the constellation Perseus

Observation data Epoch J2000 Equinox ICRS
- Constellation: Perseus
- Right ascension: 03^{h} 17^{m} 47.35287^{s}
- Declination: +44° 01′ 30.0800″
- Apparent magnitude (V): 5.49

Characteristics
- Spectral type: B7 V
- B−V color index: −0.060±0.004

Astrometry
Radial velocity (R_{v})	+4.0±2.0 km/s
Proper motion (μ)	RA: +26.07 mas/yr Dec.: −24.47 mas/yr
Parallax (π)	4.46±0.39 mas
Distance	730 ± 60 ly (220 ± 20 pc)
Absolute magnitude (M_{V})	−0.96

Orbit
Period (P)	36.5±0.1 d
Eccentricity (e)	0.3±0.2
Periastron epoch (T)	24,407,531.7±0.1
Argument of periastron (ω) (secondary)	312±9°
Semi-amplitude (K_{1}) (primary)	20±3 km/s

Details

30 Per A
Mass	4.24±0.12 M_{☉}
Luminosity	611+130 −238 L_{☉}
Temperature	9,908 K
Rotational velocity (v sin i)	212 km/s

Other designations
- 30 Per, BD+43°674, HD 20315, HIP 15338, HR 982, SAO 38704

Database references
SIMBAD	data

30 Persei is a binary star system in the northern constellation Perseus. It is faintly visible to the naked eye with an apparent visual magnitude of 5.49. Based upon an annual parallax shift of 4.46±0.39 mas, is located roughly 730 light years from the Sun. It is a member of the Perseus OB3 association, which includes the Alpha Persei Cluster.

This is a single-lined spectroscopic binary star system with an orbital period of 36.5 days and an eccentricity of roughly 0.3. The visible component is a B-type main-sequence star with a stellar classification of B7 V. It is spinning rapidly with a projected rotational velocity of 212 km/s. The star has 4.2 times the mass of the Sun and is radiating around 611 times the Sun's luminosity from its photosphere at an effective temperature of 9,908 K.
