= Pi Persei =

Star in the constellation Perseus

- Location of π Persei (circled)

Observation data Epoch J2000 Equinox ICRS
- Constellation: Perseus
- Right ascension: 02^{h} 58^{m} 45.66858^{s}
- Declination: +39° 39′ 45.8212″
- Apparent magnitude (V): 4.70

Characteristics
- Spectral type: A2Vn
- U−B color index: +0.12
- B−V color index: +0.06

Astrometry
Radial velocity (R_{v})	+14.2 km/s
Proper motion (μ)	RA: +26.224 mas/yr Dec.: −41.899 mas/yr
Parallax (π)	10.7797±0.2794 mas
Distance	303 ± 8 ly (93 ± 2 pc)
Absolute magnitude (M_{V})	−0.21

Details
Mass	2.07 M_{☉}
Radius	4.8 R_{☉}
Luminosity	170 L_{☉}
Surface gravity (log g)	3.53 cgs
Temperature	9,290 K
Rotational velocity (v sin i)	186 km/s
Age	272 Myr

Other designations
- Gorgonea Secunda, π Per, 22 Persei, BD+39°681, FK5 2207, GC 3567, HD 18411, HIP 13879, HR 879, SAO 56047

Database references
SIMBAD	data

π Persei, Latinized as Pi Persei, is a single star in the northern constellation of Perseus. It has the traditional name Gorgonea Secunda /ɡɔːrɡəˈniːə sɪˈkʌndə/, the second of three Gorgons in the mythology of the hero Perseus. This star has a white hue and is faintly visible to the naked eye with an apparent visual magnitude of +4.7. It is located at a distance of approximately 303 light years from the Sun based on parallax, and is moving further away with a radial velocity of +14 km/s.

This object is an A-type main-sequence star with a stellar classification of A2Vn, where the 'n' suffix indicates broad (nebulous) lines due to rapid rotation. It is spinning with a projected rotational velocity of 186 km/s, which is creating an equatorial bulge that is 6% wider than the polar radius. The star is 272 million years old with double the mass of the Sun. It has 4.8 times the Sun's radius and is radiating 170 times the luminosity of the Sun from its photosphere at an effective temperature of 9,290 K.

In Chinese astronomy, this star is named Jīshī (Chinese: 積屍), meaning Heap of Corpses. R. H. Allen transliterated this name as Tseih She and wrongly identified it with Algol.
