= Perseus (constellation) =

Constellation in the northern celestial hemisphere

- Constellation
- List of stars in Perseus
- Abbreviation: Per
- Genitive: Persei
- Pronunciation: /ˈpɜːrsiəs, -sjuːs/; genitive /-siaɪ/
- Symbolism: Perseus
- Right ascension: 3^{h}
- Declination: +45°
- Quadrant: NQ1
- Area: 615 sq. deg. (24th)
- Main stars: 19
- Bayer/Flamsteed stars: 65
- Stars brighter than 3.00^{m}: 5
- Stars within 10.00 pc (32.62 ly): 0
- Brightest star: α Per (Mirfak) (1.79^{m})
- Nearest star: 2MASS J0419+4233
- Messier objects: 2
- Meteor showers: Perseids; September Perseids
- Bordering constellations: Aries; Taurus; Auriga; Camelopardalis; Cassiopeia; Andromeda; Triangulum
- Visible at latitudes between +90° and −35°. Best visible at 21:00 (9 p.m.) during the month of December.

Perseus is a constellation in the northern sky, named after the Greek mythological hero Perseus. It is one of the 48 ancient constellations listed by the 2nd-century astronomer Ptolemy, and among the 88 modern constellations defined by the International Astronomical Union (IAU). It is located near several other constellations named after ancient Greek legends surrounding Perseus, including Andromeda to the west and Cassiopeia to the north. Perseus is also bordered by Aries and Taurus to the south, Auriga to the east, Camelopardalis to the north, and Triangulum to the west. Some star atlases during the early 19th century also depicted Perseus holding the disembodied head of Medusa, whose asterism was named together as Perseus et Caput Medusae; however, this never came into popular usage.

The galactic plane of the Milky Way passes through Perseus, whose brightest star is the yellow-white supergiant Alpha Persei (also called Mirfak), which shines at magnitude 1.79. It and many of the surrounding stars are members of an open cluster known as the Alpha Persei Cluster. The best-known star, however, is Algol (Beta Persei), linked with ominous legends because of its variability, which is noticeable to the naked eye. Rather than being an intrinsically variable star, it is an eclipsing binary. Other notable star systems in Perseus include X Persei, a binary system containing a neutron star, and GK Persei, a nova that peaked at magnitude 0.2 in 1901. The Double Cluster, comprising two open clusters quite near each other in the sky, was known to the ancient Chinese. The constellation gives its name to the Perseus Cluster (Abell 426), a massive galaxy cluster located 250 million light-years from Earth. It hosts the radiant of the annual Perseids meteor shower—one of the most prominent meteor showers in the sky.

== History and mythology ==
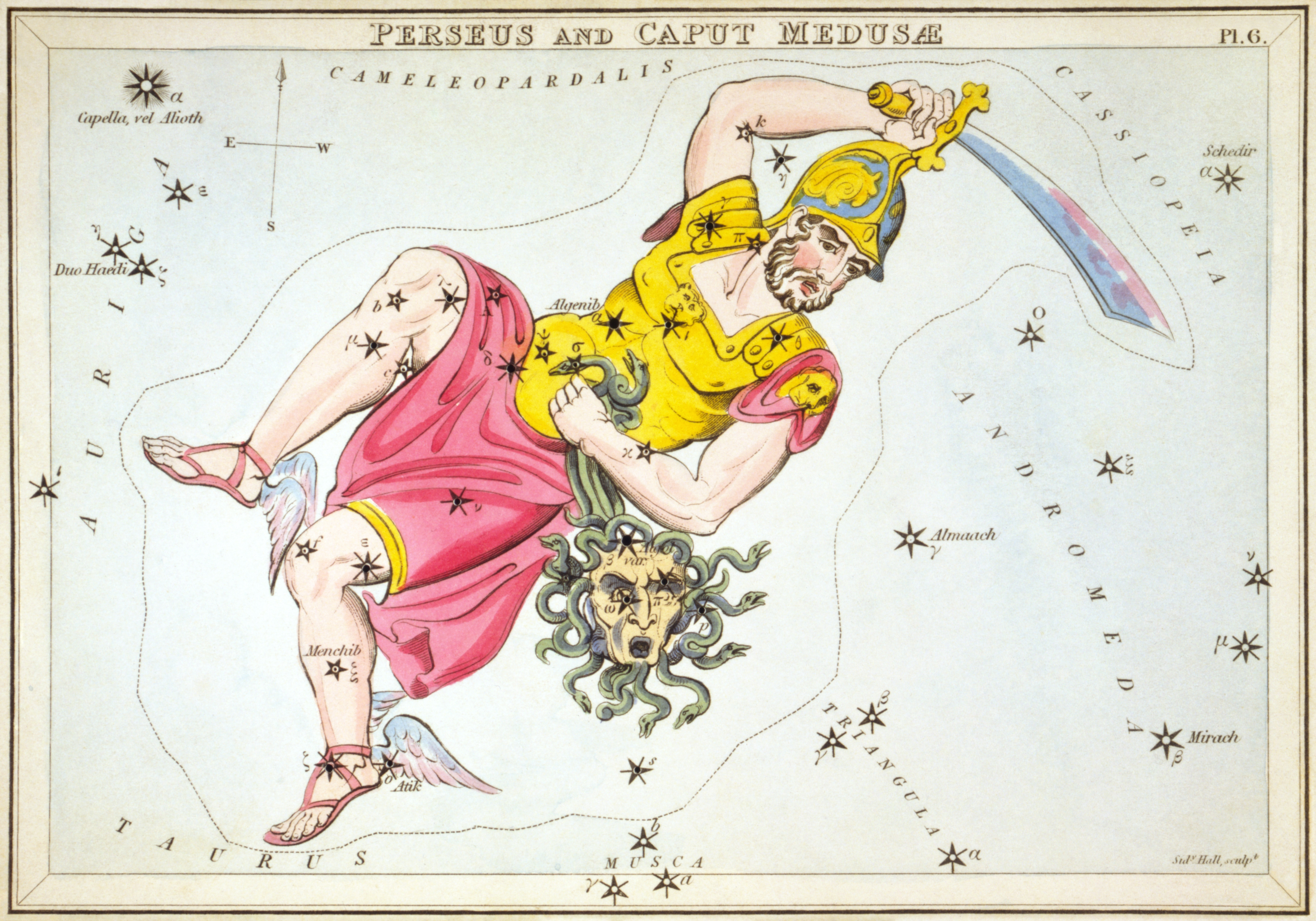
Perseus carrying the head of Medusa the Gorgon, as depicted in Urania's Mirror, a set of constellation cards published in London c.1825

In Greek mythology, Perseus was the son of Danaë, who was sent by King Polydectes to bring the head of Medusa the Gorgon—whose visage caused all who gazed upon her to turn to stone. Perseus slew Medusa in her sleep, and Pegasus and Chrysaor appeared from her body. Perseus continued to the realm of Cepheus whose daughter Andromeda was to be sacrificed to Cetus the sea monster.

Perseus rescued Andromeda from the monster by killing it with his sword. He turned Polydectes and his followers to stone with Medusa's head and appointed Dictys the fisherman king. Perseus and Andromeda married and had six children. In the sky, Perseus lies near the constellations Andromeda, Cepheus, Cassiopeia (Andromeda's mother), Cetus, and Pegasus.

In Neo-Assyrian Babylonia (911–605 BC), the constellation of Perseus was known as the Old Man constellation (SU.GI), then associated with East in the MUL.APIN, an astronomical text from the 7th century.

=== In non-Western astronomy ===
Four Chinese constellations are contained in the area of the sky identified with Perseus in the West. Tiānchuán (天船), the Celestial Boat, was the third paranatellon (a star or constellation which rises at the same time as another star or object) of the third house of the White Tiger of the West, representing the boats that Chinese people were reminded to build in case of a catastrophic flood season. Incorporating stars from the northern part of the constellation, it contained Mu, Delta, Psi, Alpha, Gamma and Eta Persei. Jīshuǐ (積水), the Swollen Waters, was the fourth paranatellon of the aforementioned house, representing the potential of unusually high floods during the end of August and beginning of September at the beginning of the flood season. Lambda and possibly Mu Persei lay within it. Dàlíng (大陵), the Great Trench, was the fifth paranatellon of that house, representing the trenches where criminals executed en masse in August were interred. It was formed by Kappa, Omega, Rho, 24, 17 and 15 Persei. The pile of corpses prior to their interment was represented by Jīshī (積屍, Pi Persei), the sixth paranatellon of the house. The Double Cluster, h and Chi Persei, had special significance in Chinese astronomy.

In Polynesia, Perseus was not commonly recognized as a separate constellation; the only people that named it were those of the Society Islands, who called it Faa-iti, meaning "Little Valley". Algol may have been named Matohi by the Māori people, but the evidence for this identification is disputed. Matohi ("Split") occasionally came into conflict with Tangaroa-whakapau over which of them should appear in the sky, the outcome affecting the tides. It matches the Maori description of a blue-white star near Aldebaran but does not disappear as the myth would indicate.

== Characteristics ==
Perseus is bordered by Aries and Taurus to the south, Auriga to the east, Camelopardalis and Cassiopeia to the north, and Andromeda and Triangulum to the west. Covering 615 square degrees, it ranks twenty-fourth of the 88 constellations in size. It appears prominently in the northern sky during the Northern Hemisphere's spring. Its main asterism consists of 19 stars. The constellation's boundaries, as set by Belgian astronomer Eugène Delporte in 1930, are defined by a 26-sided polygon. In the equatorial coordinate system, the right ascension coordinates of these borders lie between 01^{h} 29.1^{m} and 04^{h} 51.2^{m} , while the declination coordinates are between 30.92° and 59.11°. The International Astronomical Union (IAU) adopted the three-letter abbreviation "Per" for the constellation in 1922.

== Features ==
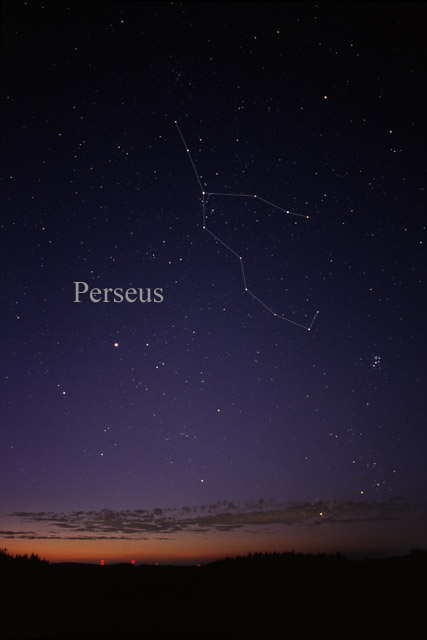
The constellation Perseus as it can be seen by the naked eye

=== Stars ===
Algol (from the Arabic رأس الغول Ra's al-Ghul, which means The Demon's Head), also known by its Bayer designation Beta Persei, is the best-known star in Perseus. Representing the head of the Gorgon Medusa in Greek mythology, it was called Horus in Egyptian mythology and Rosh ha Satan ("Satan's Head") in Hebrew. Located 92.8 light-years from Earth, it varies in apparent magnitude from a minimum of 3.5 to a maximum of 2.3 over a period of 2.867 days. The star system is the prototype of a group of eclipsing binary stars named Algol variables, though it has a third member to make up what is actually a triple star system. The brightest component is a blue-white main-sequence star of spectral type B8V, which is 3.5 times as massive and 180 times as luminous as the Sun. The secondary component is an orange subgiant star of type K0IV that has begun cooling and expanding to 3.5 times the radius of the Sun, and has 4.5 times the luminosity and 80% of its mass. These two are separated by only 0.05 astronomical units (AU)—five percent of the distance between the Earth and Sun; the main dip in brightness arises when the larger fainter companion passes in front of the hotter brighter primary. The tertiary component is a main sequence star of type A7, which is located on average 2.69 AU from the other two stars. AG Persei is another Algol variable in Perseus, whose primary component is a B-type main sequence star with an apparent magnitude of 6.69. Phi Persei (Dajiangjunbei)is a double star, although the two components do not eclipse each other. The primary star is a Be star of spectral type B0.5, possibly a giant star, and the secondary companion is likely a stellar remnant. The secondary has a similar spectral type to O-type subdwarfs.

With the historical name Mirfak (Arabic for elbow) or Algenib, Alpha Persei is the brightest star of this constellation with an apparent magnitude of 1.79. A supergiant of spectral type F5Ib located around 590 light-years away from Earth, Mirfak has 5,000 times the luminosity and 42 times the diameter of the Sun. It is the brightest member of the Alpha Persei Cluster (also known as Melotte 20 and Collinder 39), which is an open cluster containing many luminous stars. Neighboring bright stars that are members include the 3.0 magnitude Be stars Delta (Sarvvis) Psi (4.3), and 48 Persei (4.0), the 2.9 magnitude Beta Cephei variable Epsilon Persei (Áldu) and the stars 29 (5.2), 30 (5.5), 31 (5.0), and 34 Persei (4.7). Of magnitude 4.05, nearby Iota Persei has been considered a member of the group, but is actually located a mere 34 light-years distant. This star is very similar to the Sun, shining with 2.2 times its luminosity. It is a yellow main sequence star of spectral type G0V. Extensive searches have failed to find evidence of it having a planetary system.

Zeta Persei is the third-brightest star in the constellation at magnitude 2.86. Around 750 light-years from Earth, it is a blue-white supergiant 26–27 times the radius of the Sun and 47,000 times its luminosity. It is the brightest star (as seen from Earth) of a moving group of bright blue-white giant and supergiant stars, the Perseus OB2 Association or Zeta Persei Association. Zeta is a triple star system, with a companion blue-white main sequence star of spectral type B8 and apparent magnitude 9.16 around 3,900 AU distant from the primary, and a white main sequence star of magnitude 9.90 and spectral type A2, some 50,000 AU away, that may or may not be gravitationally bound to the other two. X Persei is a double system in this association; one component is a hot, bright star and the other is a neutron star. With an apparent magnitude of 6.72, it is too dim to be seen with the naked eye even in perfectly dark conditions. The system is an X-ray source and the primary star appears to be undergoing substantial mass loss.

Once thought to be a member of the Perseus OB2 Association, Omicron Persei (Atik) is a multiple star system with a combined visual magnitude of 3.85. It is composed of two blue-white stars—a giant of spectral class B1.5 and main sequence star of B3—which orbit each other every 4.5 days and are distorted into ovoids due to their small separation. The system has a third star about which little is known. At an estimated distance of 1,475 light-years from Earth, the system is now thought to lie too far from the center of the Zeta Persei group to belong to it.

GRO J0422+32 (V518 Persei) is another X-ray binary in Perseus. One component is a red dwarf star of spectral type M4.5V, which orbits a mysterious dense and heavy object—possibly a black hole—every 5.1 hours. The system is an X-ray nova, meaning that it experiences periodic outbursts in the X-ray band of the electromagnetic spectrum. If the system does indeed contain a black hole, it would be the smallest one ever recorded. Further analysis in 2012 calculated a mass of 2.1 solar masses, which raises questions as to what the object actually is as it appears to be too small to be a black hole.

GK Persei, also known as Nova Persei 1901, is a bright nova that appeared halfway between Algol and Delta Persei. Discovered on 21 February 1901 by Scottish amateur astronomer Thomas David Anderson, it peaked at magnitude 0.2—almost as bright as Capella and Vega. It faded to magnitude 13 around 30 years after its peak brightness. Xi Persei, traditionally known as Menkhib, a blue giant of spectral type O7III, is one of the hottest bright stars in the sky, with a surface temperature of 37,500 K. It is one of the more massive stars, being between 26 and 32 solar masses, and is 330,000 times as luminous as the Sun.

Named Gorgonea Tertia, Rho Persei varies in brightness like Algol, but is a pulsating rather than eclipsing star. At an advanced stage of stellar evolution, it is a red giant that has expanded for the second time to have a radius around 150 times that of the Sun. Its helium has been fused into heavier elements and its core is composed of carbon and oxygen. It is a semiregular variable star of the Mu Cephei type, whose apparent magnitude varies between 3.3 and 4.0 with periods of 50, 120 and 250 days. The Double Cluster contains three even larger stars, each over 700 solar radii: S, RS, and SU Persei are all semiregular pulsating M-type supergiants. The stars are not visible to the naked eye; SU Persei, the brightest of the three, has an apparent magnitude of 7.9 and thus is visible through binoculars. AX Persei is another binary star, the primary component is a red giant in an advanced phase of stellar evolution, which is transferring material onto an accretion disc around a smaller star. The star system is one of the few eclipsing symbiotic binaries, but is unusual because the secondary star is not a white dwarf, but an A-type star. DY Persei is a variable star that is the prototype of DY Persei variables, which are carbon-rich R Coronae Borealis variables that exhibit the variability of asymptotic giant branch stars. DY Persei itself is a carbon star that is too dim to see through binoculars, with an apparent magnitude of 10.6.

Seven stars in Perseus have been found to have planetary systems. V718 Persei is a star in the young open cluster IC 348 that appears to be periodically eclipsed by a giant planet every 4.7 years. This has been inferred to be an object with a maximum mass of 6 times that of Jupiter and an orbital radius of 3.3 AU.

=== Deep-sky objects ===
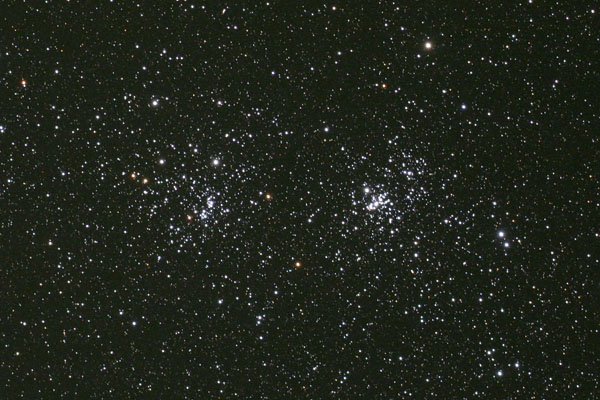
The Double Cluster (NGC 869 and NGC 884)

The galactic plane of the Milky Way passes through Perseus, but is much less obvious than elsewhere in the sky as it is mostly obscured by molecular clouds. The Perseus Arm is a spiral arm of the Milky Way galaxy and stretches across the sky from the constellation Cassiopeia through Perseus and Auriga to Gemini and Monoceros. This segment is towards the rim of the galaxy.

Within the Perseus Arm lie two open clusters (NGC 869 and NGC 884) known as the Double Cluster. Sometimes known as h and Chi (χ) Persei, respectively, they are easily visible through binoculars and small telescopes. Both lie more than 7,000 light-years from Earth and are several hundred light-years apart. Both clusters are of approximately magnitude 4 and 0.5 degrees in diameter. The two are Trumpler class I 3 r clusters, though NGC 869 is a Shapley class f and NGC 884 is a Shapley class e cluster. These classifications indicate that they are both quite rich (dense); NGC 869 is the richer of the pair. The clusters are both distinct from the surrounding star field and are clearly concentrated at their centers. The constituent stars, numbering over 100 in each cluster, range widely in brightness.

M34 is an open cluster that appears at magnitude 5.5, and is approximately 1,500 light-years from Earth. It contains about 100 stars scattered over a field of view larger than that of the full moon. M34 can be resolved with good eyesight but is best viewed using a telescope at low magnifications. IC 348 is a somewhat young open cluster that is still contained within the nebula from which its stars formed. It is located about 1,027 light-years from Earth, is about 2 million years old, and contains many stars with circumstellar disks. Many brown dwarfs have been discovered in this cluster due to its age; since brown dwarfs cool as they age, it is easier to find them in younger clusters.

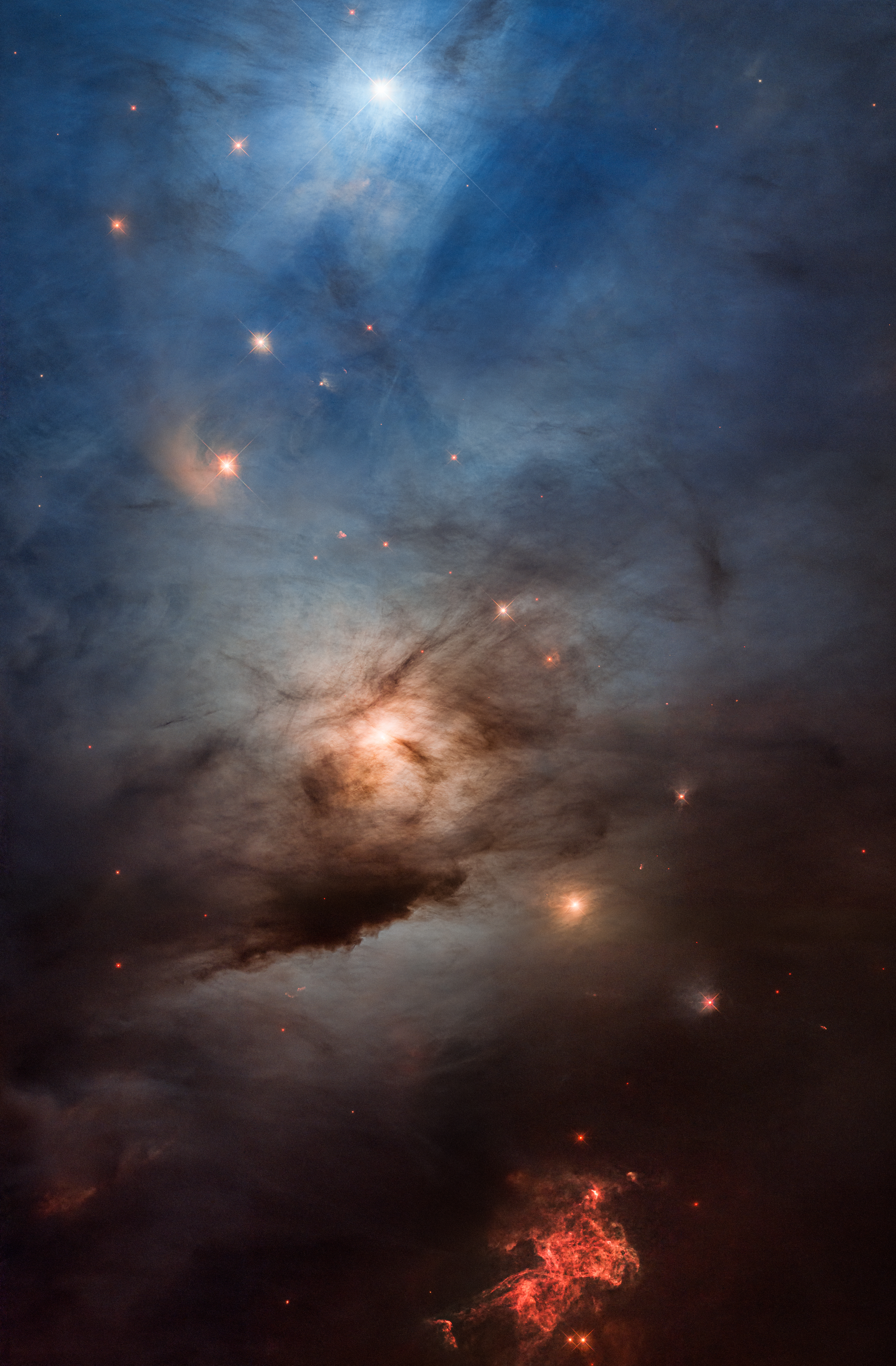
NGC 1333, a nebula in the Perseus molecular cloud featuring glowing gases and pitch-black dust stirred up and blown around by several hundred newly forming stars embedded within the dark cloud.

There are many nebulae in Perseus. M76 is a planetary nebula, also called the Little Dumbbell Nebula. It appears two arc-minutes by one arc-minute across and has an apparent brightness of magnitude 10.1. NGC 1499, also known as the California Nebula, is an emission nebula that was discovered in 1884–85 by American astronomer Edward E. Barnard. It is very difficult to observe visually because its low surface brightness makes it appear dimmer than most other emission nebulae. NGC 1333 is a reflection nebula and a star-forming region. Perseus also contains a giant molecular cloud, called the Perseus molecular cloud; it belongs to the Orion Spur and is known for its low rate of star formation compared to similar clouds.

Perseus contains some notable galaxies. NGC 1023 is a barred spiral galaxy of magnitude 10.35, around 30 million light-years (9.2 million parsecs) from Earth. It is the principal member of the NGC 1023 group of galaxies and is possibly interacting with another galaxy. NGC 1260 is either a lenticular or tightly wound spiral galaxy about 250 million ly (77 million pc) from Earth. It was the host galaxy of the supernova SN 2006gy, one of the brightest ever recorded. It is a member of the Perseus Cluster (Abell 426), a massive galaxy cluster located 250 million ly (77 million pc) from Earth. With a redshift of 0.0179, Abell 426 is the closest major cluster to the Earth. NGC 1275, a component of the cluster, is a Seyfert galaxy containing an active nucleus that produces jets of material, surrounding the galaxy with massive bubbles. These bubbles create sound waves that travel through the Perseus Cluster, sounding a B flat 57 octaves below middle C. This galaxy is a cD galaxy that has undergone many galactic mergers throughout its existence, as evidenced by the "high velocity system"—the remnants of a smaller galaxy—surrounding it. Its active nucleus is a strong source of radio waves.

=== Meteor showers ===
The Perseids are a prominent annual meteor shower that appear to radiate from Perseus from mid-July, peaking in activity between 9 and 14 August each year. Associated with Comet Swift–Tuttle, they have been observed for about 2,000 years. The September Epsilon Perseids, discovered in 2012, are a meteor shower with an unknown parent body in the Oort cloud.

== See also ==
- Perseus (Chinese astronomy)

== Cited texts ==
- Levy, David H. (2005). Deep Sky Objects. Amherst, New York: Prometheus Books. ISBN 978-1-59102-361-6.
- Makemson, M. W. (1941). The Morning Star Rises: An Account of Polynesian Astronomy. New Haven, Connecticut: Yale University Press. Bibcode:1941msra.book.....M.
- Motz, L.; Nathanson, C. (1991). The Constellations: An Enthusiast's Guide to the Night Sky. London, United Kingdom: Aurum Press. ISBN 978-1-85410-088-7.
- Schlegel, Gustaaf (1967) [1875]. Uranographie Chinoise (in French). Taipei, Republic of China: Ch'eng Wen Publishing Company.
- Staal, Julius D. W. (1984). Stars of Jade: Astronomy and Star Lore of Very Ancient Imperial China. Decatur, Georgia: Writ Press. ISBN 978-0-914653-00-4.
