= IC 348 =

Reflection nebula in the constellation Perseus

- IC 348 imaged by James Webb Space Telescope

Observation data (J2000 epoch)
- Right ascension: 03^{h} 44^{m} 31.7^{s}
- Declination: +32° 09′ 32″
- Distance: 1,028 ly (315 pc)
- Apparent magnitude (V): 7.3
- Apparent dimensions (V): 20'

Physical characteristics
- Estimated age: 5±2 Million years
- Other designations: C 0341+321, Collinder 41

Associations
- Constellation: Perseus

IC 348 is a star-forming region in the constellation Perseus, just south of the bright star Omicron Persei. It is located about 1,000 light years from the Sun. Together with NGC 1333 it is part of the Perseus molecular cloud. It consists of nebulosity and an associated 2-million-year-old cluster of roughly 400 stars within an angular diameter of 20″. A later work found an older age of about 5 million years. The most massive stars in the cluster are the binary star system HD 281159 (BD+31°643), which has a combined spectral class of B5, and is surrounded by an accretion disk. This binary is surrounded by an incomplete spherical shell open to the northwest, 50,000 AU in diameter, seen in infrared images from Spitzer and JWST.

Based upon infrared observations using the Spitzer Space Telescope, about half of the stars in the cluster have a circumstellar disk, of which 60% are thick or primordial disks. One team observed 136 class II sources with ALMA, detecting 40 sources. The team found disk masses similar to disks in Chamaeleon I and the Sigma Orionis Cluster. 20 disks (about 5%) are massive enough to form giant planets. The 96 non-detected disks have dust masses below around 0.4 M_{🜨} and might be capable of forming small rocky planets.

IC 348 shows a rich molecular chemistry. It contains common molecules such as hydrogen molecules, hydroxyl, water, carbon dioxide and ammonia. Additionally it contains several carbonaceous molecules, including complex molecules such as PAHs and fullerenes. In 2023, the emission spectrum of tryptophan was claimed to be discovered in the interstellar gas of the star cluster IC 348. A re-analysis of the Spitzer data did not find any tryptophan. Later observations with JWST and an improved laboratory spectrum showed that IC 348 does not contain any tryptophan. The team showed that the lines were due to instrumental artifacts.

== Planetary-mass brown dwarfs ==
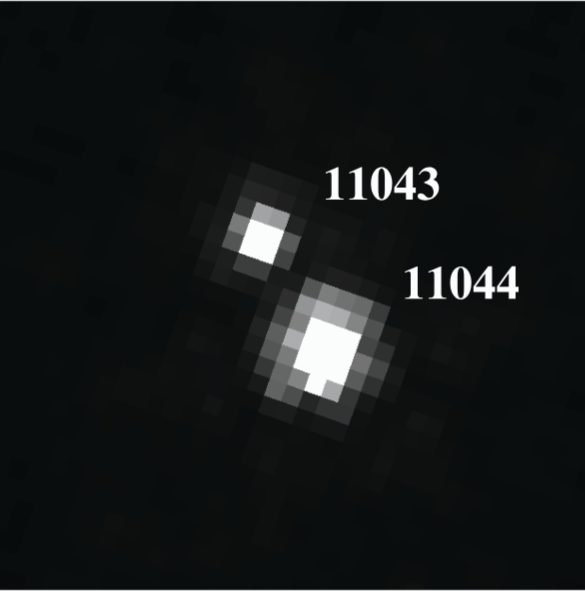
A planetary-mass binary consisting out of two objects. The primary LRL 11044 has a mass of 12 M_{J} and the secondary LRL 11043 has a mass of 6 M_{J}.

The young age and close proximity to earth allows astronomers to study star-formation down to the lowest masses. Astronomers have found a number of so called free-floating planetary-mass objects that probably formed like stars and are called planetary-mass brown dwarfs.

Multiple works did detect planetary-mass objects (PMOs) in IC 348. These PMOs were found to have masses as low as 4-5 M_{J} from searches with Hubble and Spitzer. Additionally it was found that around 46% of these objects are surrounded by a disk.

The relatively young age of the IC 348 star cluster has facilitated the discovery of three low-mass brown dwarfs. As these objects cool over time, they become more detectable, particularly in their youth. Recent observations conducted in 2023 by the James Webb Space Telescope (JWST) have confirmed these findings, identifying them as the smallest free-floating brown dwarfs on record, with the lightest among them weighing a mere three to four times the mass of Jupiter. This groundbreaking revelation, announced by NASA's James Webb Space Telescope team, challenges existing paradigms in the field of stellar formation. Found within the IC 348 cluster, located 1,000 light-years away in the Perseus star-forming region, these brown dwarfs serve as intriguing celestial entities, bridging the gap between stars and planets. Some share striking similarities with gas giants, boasting masses just slightly larger than Jupiter. JWST has discovered new PMOs down to 2 M_{J}. Spectroscopy with NIRSpec has shown that the brightest PMOs resemble L dwarfs. The faintest and lowest mass objects do however show absorption of hydrocarbons at 3.4 μm, which lead the researchers to propose a new spectral type of "H". Two objects in this sample showed infrared excess due to a disk around the PMOs. One object, called LRL 11001 (mass ~6 M_{J}) was observed with higher resolution with NIRSpec. It showed that the 3.4 μm absorption fits with CH_{2} and CH_{3} groups, indicating large alkanes. Additionally the spectrum showed emission by methane. The researchers suspect that vertical mixing suppressed methane and enhanced large alkanes. Methane only survives in the upper atmosphere, where it is excited by an unknown mechanism.

== Gallery ==
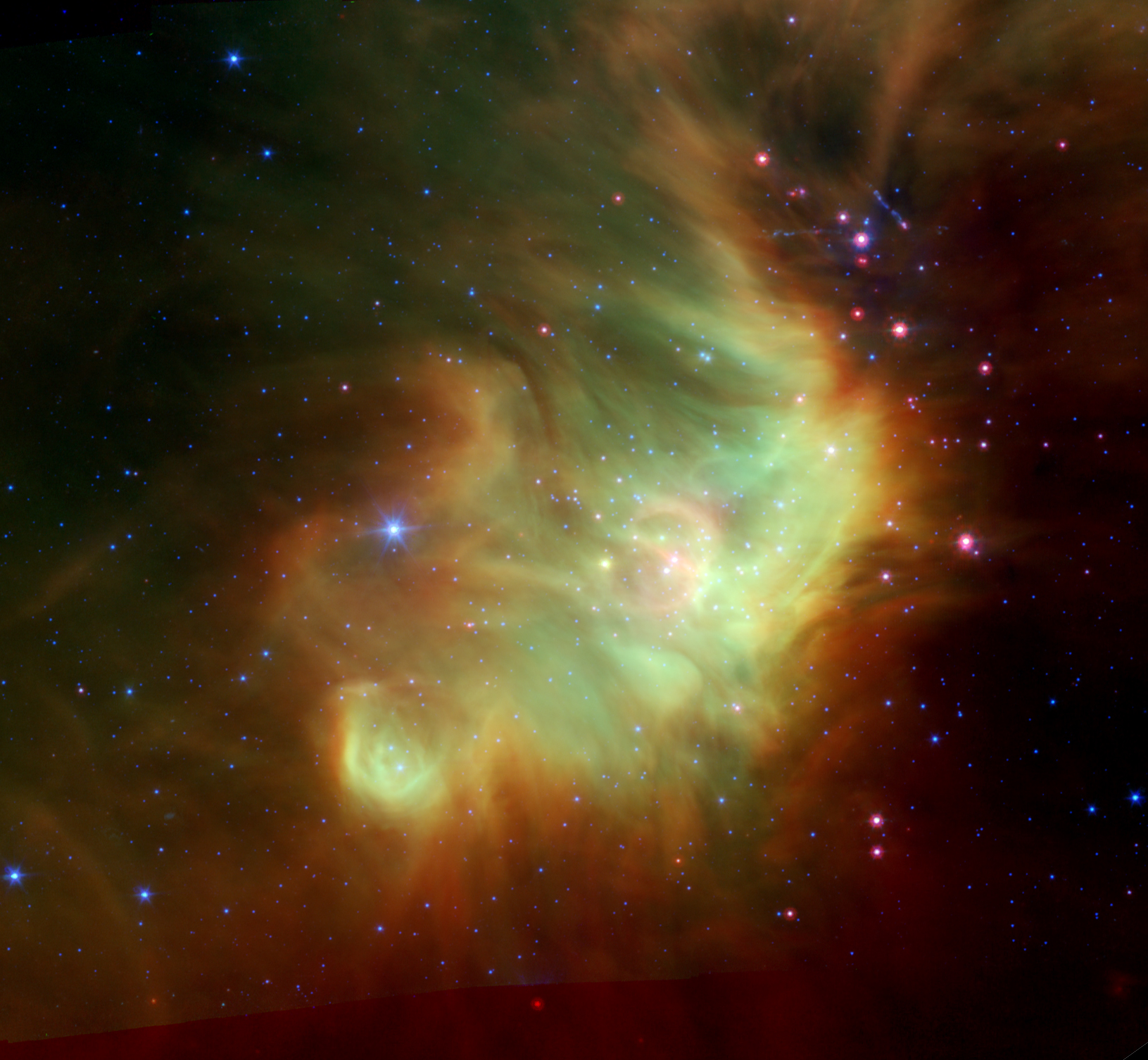
Spitzer Space Telescope image of IC 348

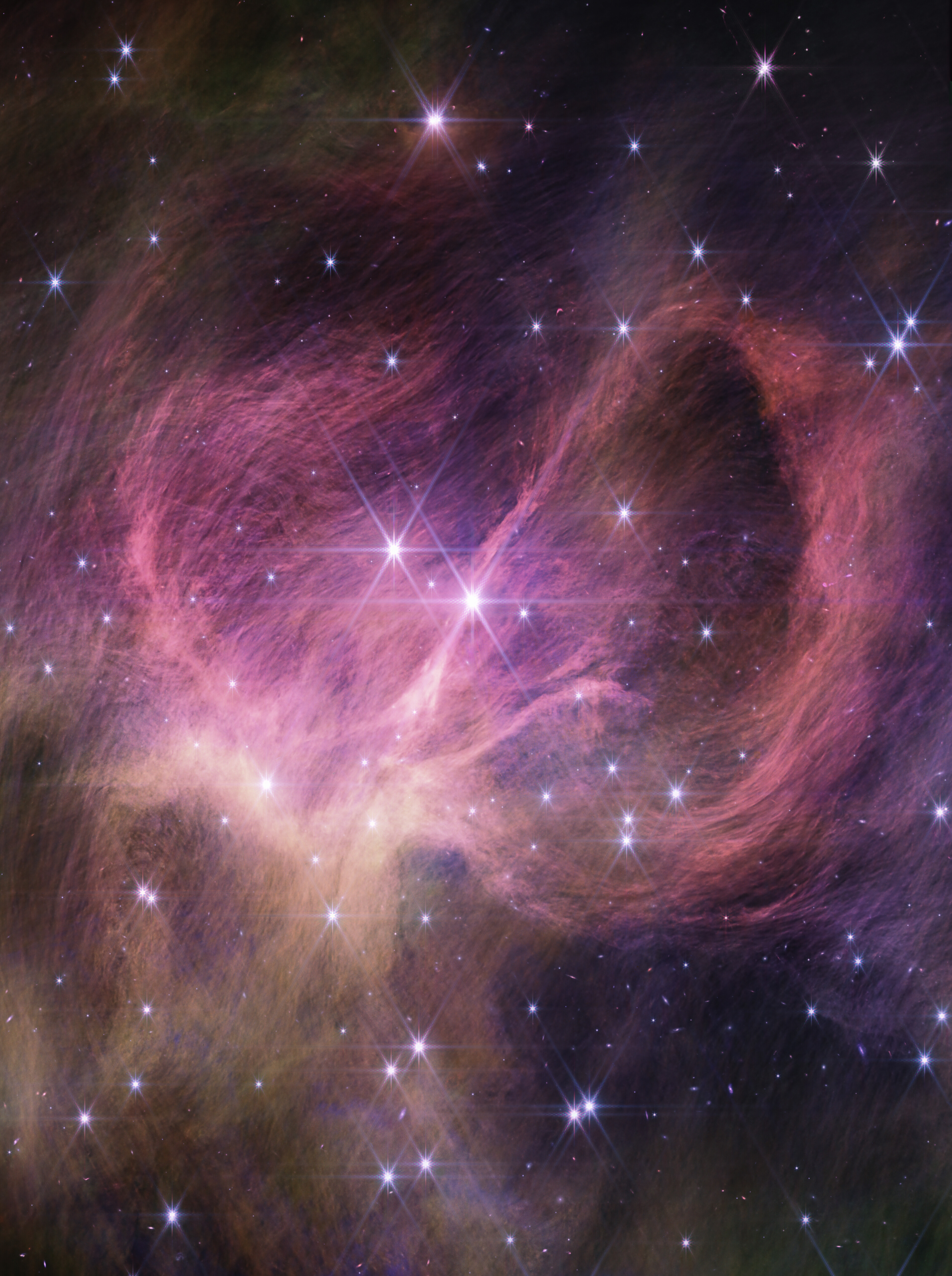
JWST NIRCam image of the shell around HD 281159 (bright star at the very center). The bright star at the middle left is IC 348 12.

JWST NIRCam image of a large portion of IC 348. At the lower right are outflows, belonging to IC 348.

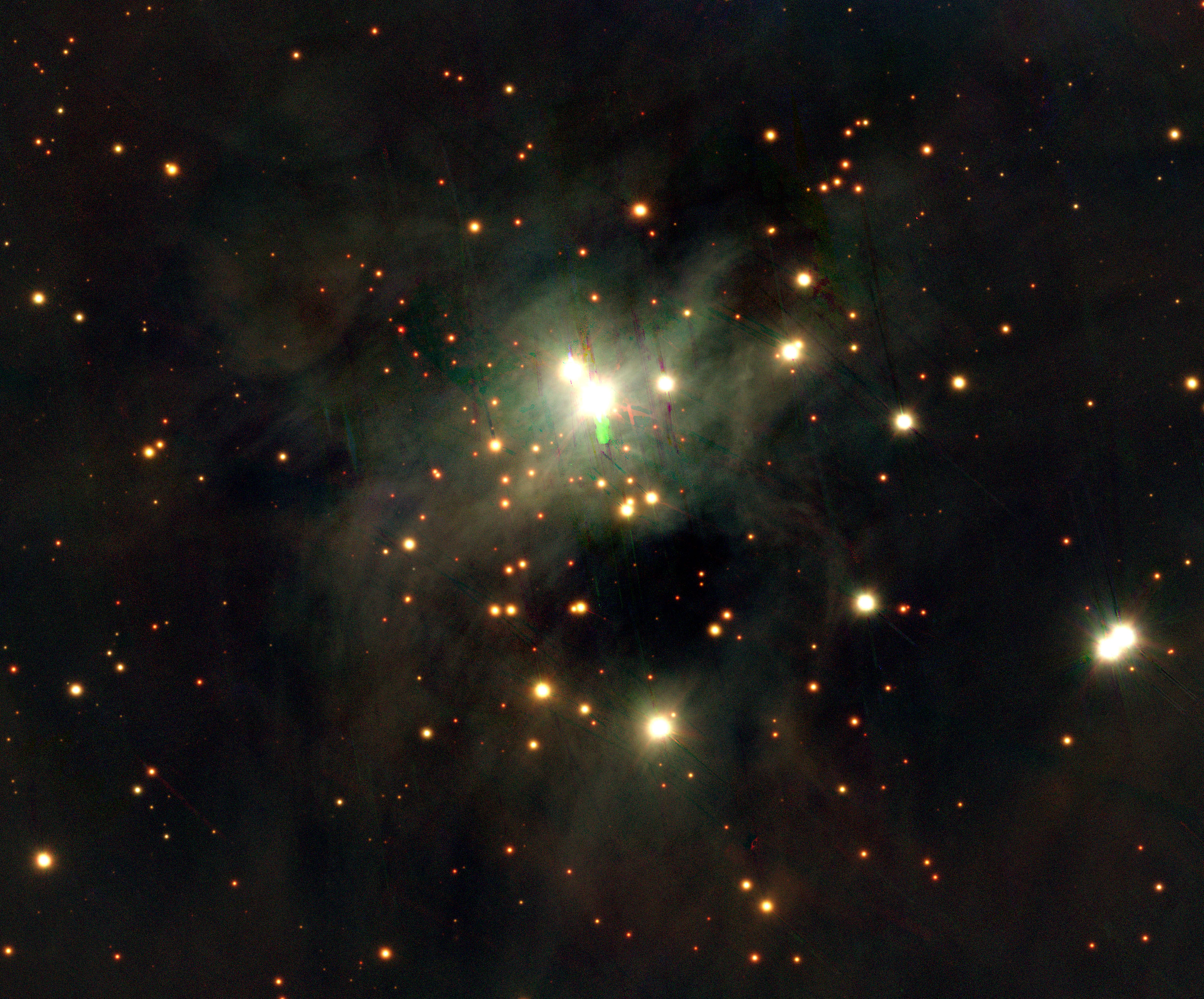
IC 348 with PanSTARRS in visible to infrared light

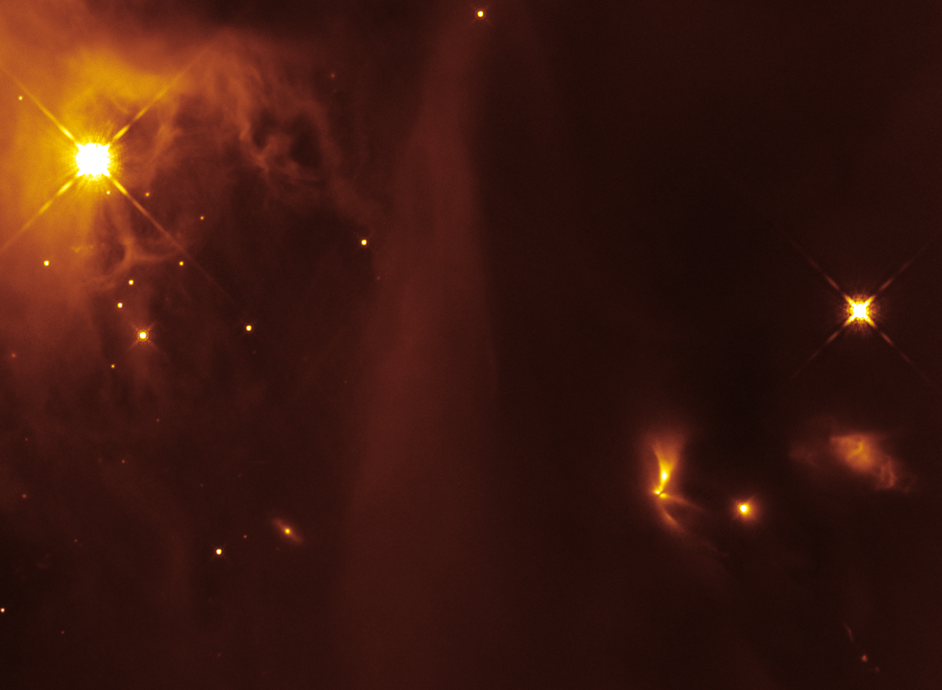
Hubble image of LRLL 54361 (lower right) and its surroundings in IC 348.

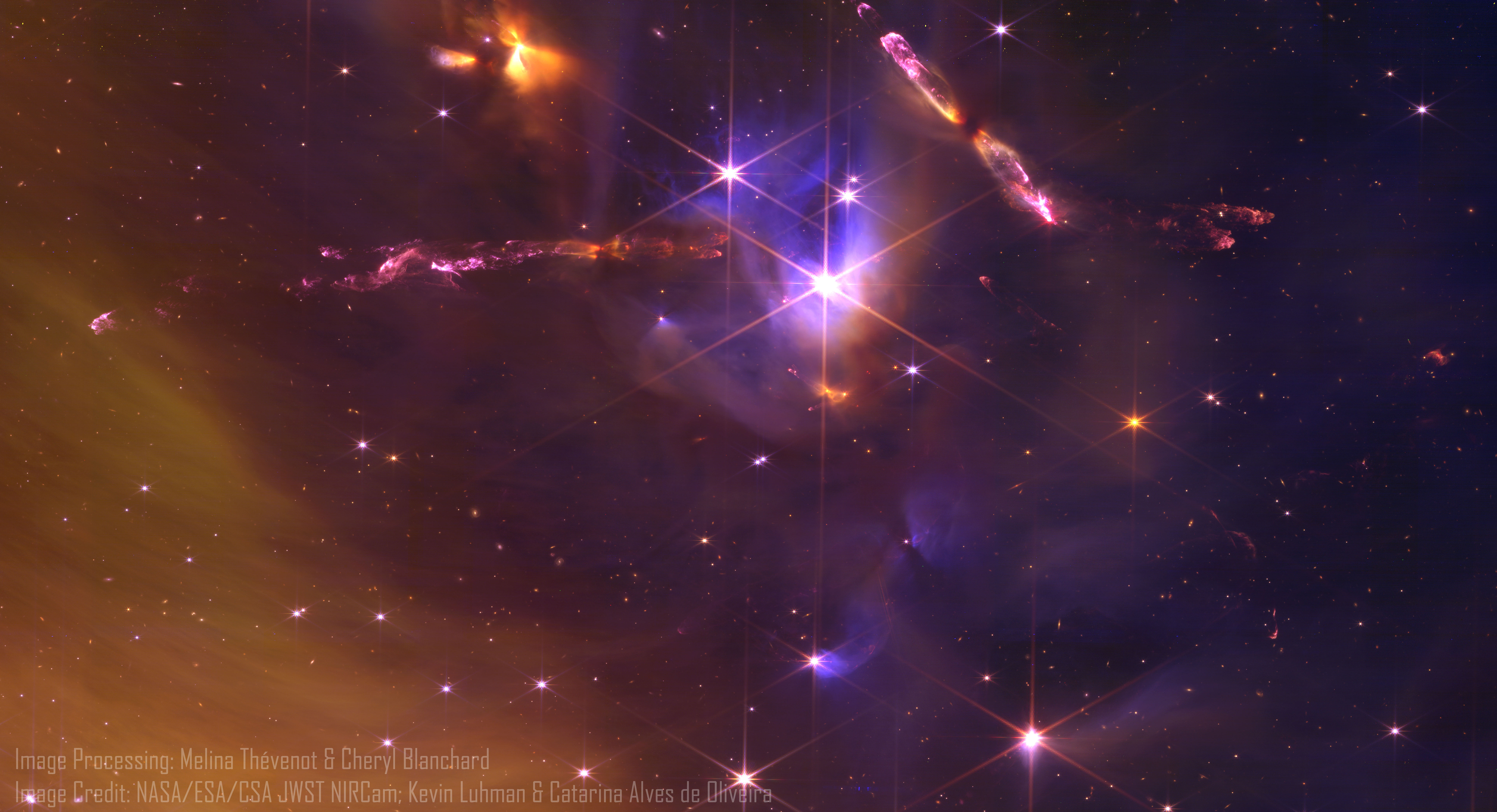
Outflows located south-west of IC 348. These include HH 211, HH 797A and LRLL 54361. The reflection nebula in the center is called the flying ghost nebula. NIRCam image.

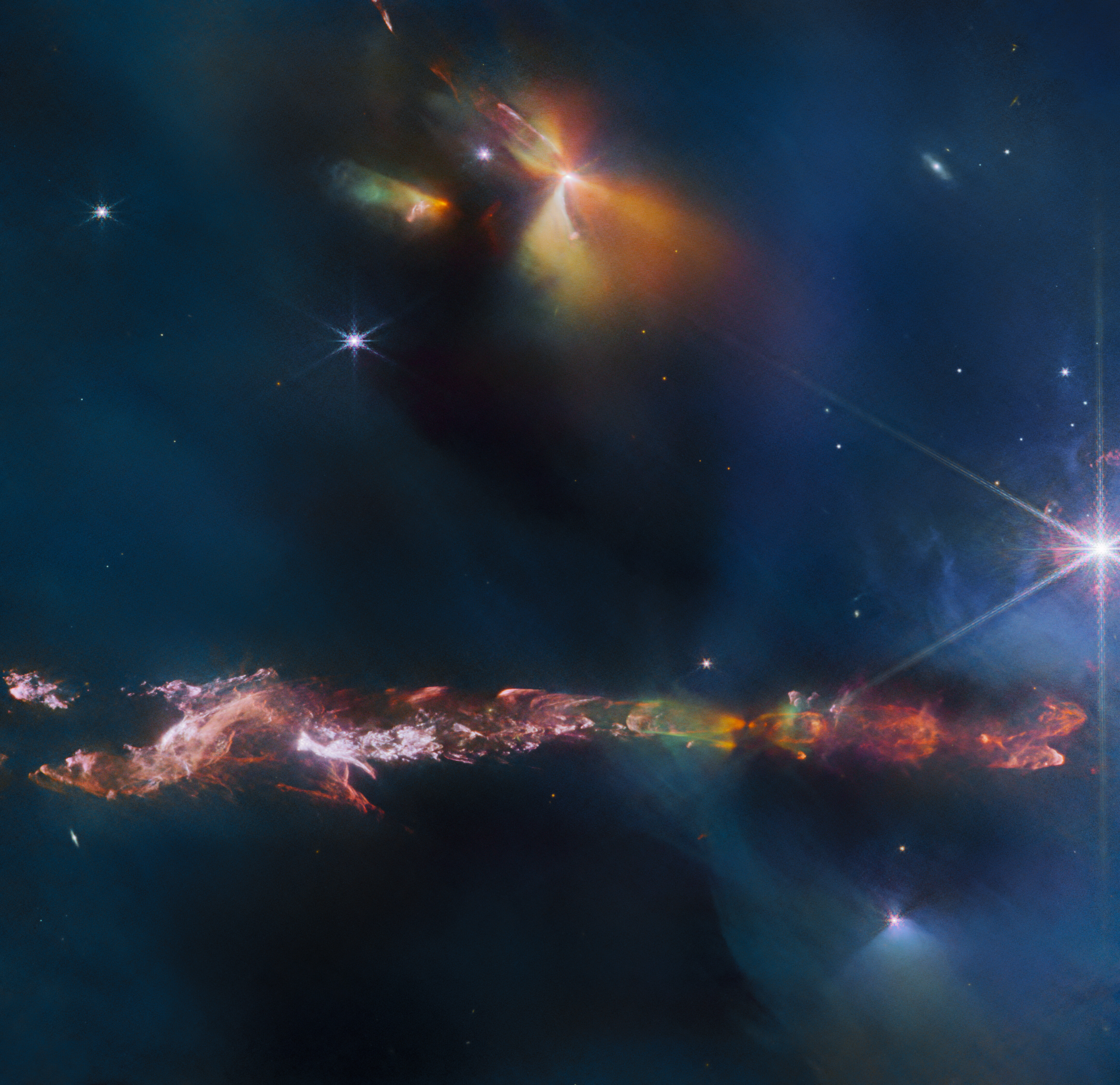
HH 797 and LRLL 54361 (top) with JWST NIRCam

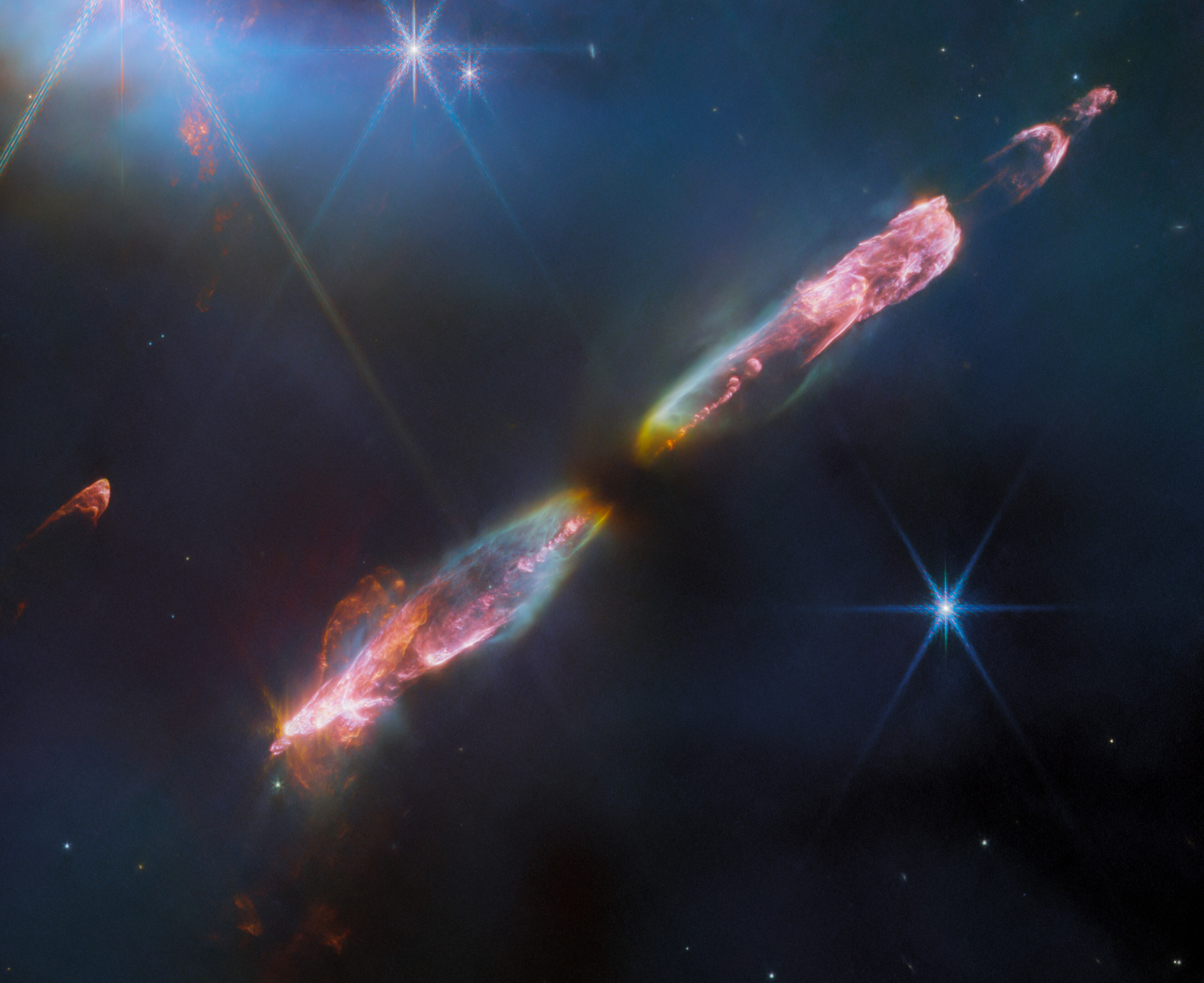
The Herbig-Haro object HH 211 with JWST NIRCam.

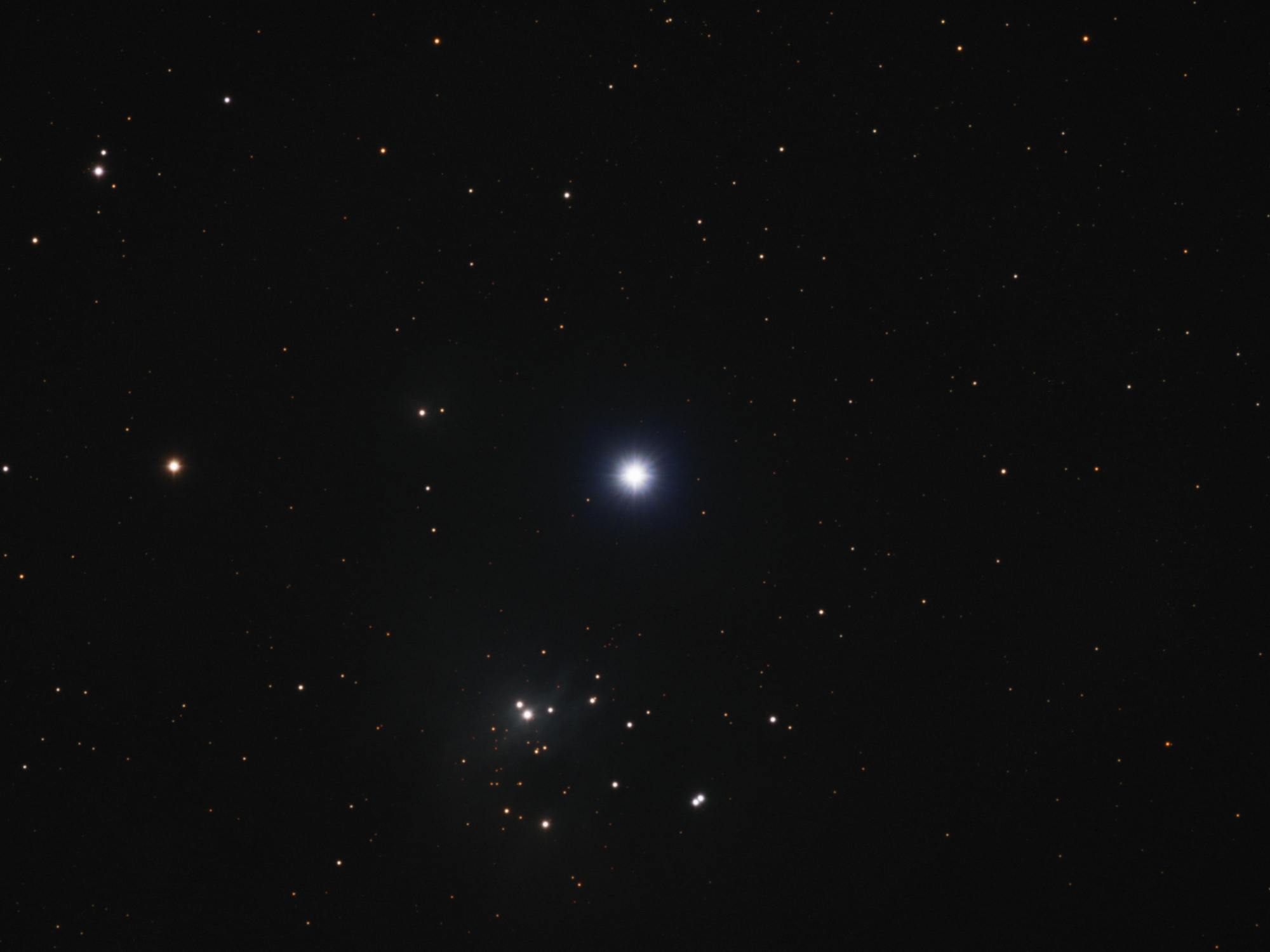
IC 348 south of Omicron Persei
