= Barnard 203 =

Dark nebula in constellation Perseus

Molecular cloud
- dark nebula
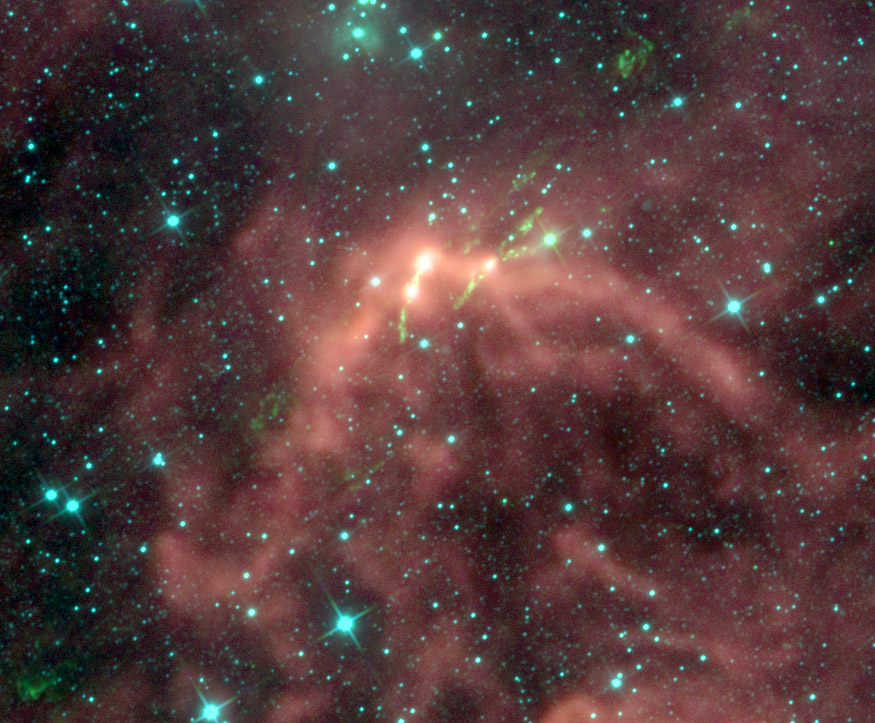
- Barnard 203 seen by WISE and Herschel

Observation data: J2000.0 epoch
- Right ascension: 03^{h} 22^{m} 30.0^{s}
- Declination: +30° 35′ 00″
- Distance: 800 ly (250 pc)
- Constellation: Perseus
- Designations: Barnard 203, LDN 1448

The dark nebula Barnard 203 or Lynds 1448 is located about one degree southwest of NGC 1333 in the Perseus molecular cloud, at a distance of about 800 light-years. Three infrared sources were observed in this region by IRAS, called IRS 1, IRS 2 and IRS 3.

The region also contains multiple Herbig-Haro objects, including HH 193–197, which are driven by the protostars in this region.

== The young stellar object population ==
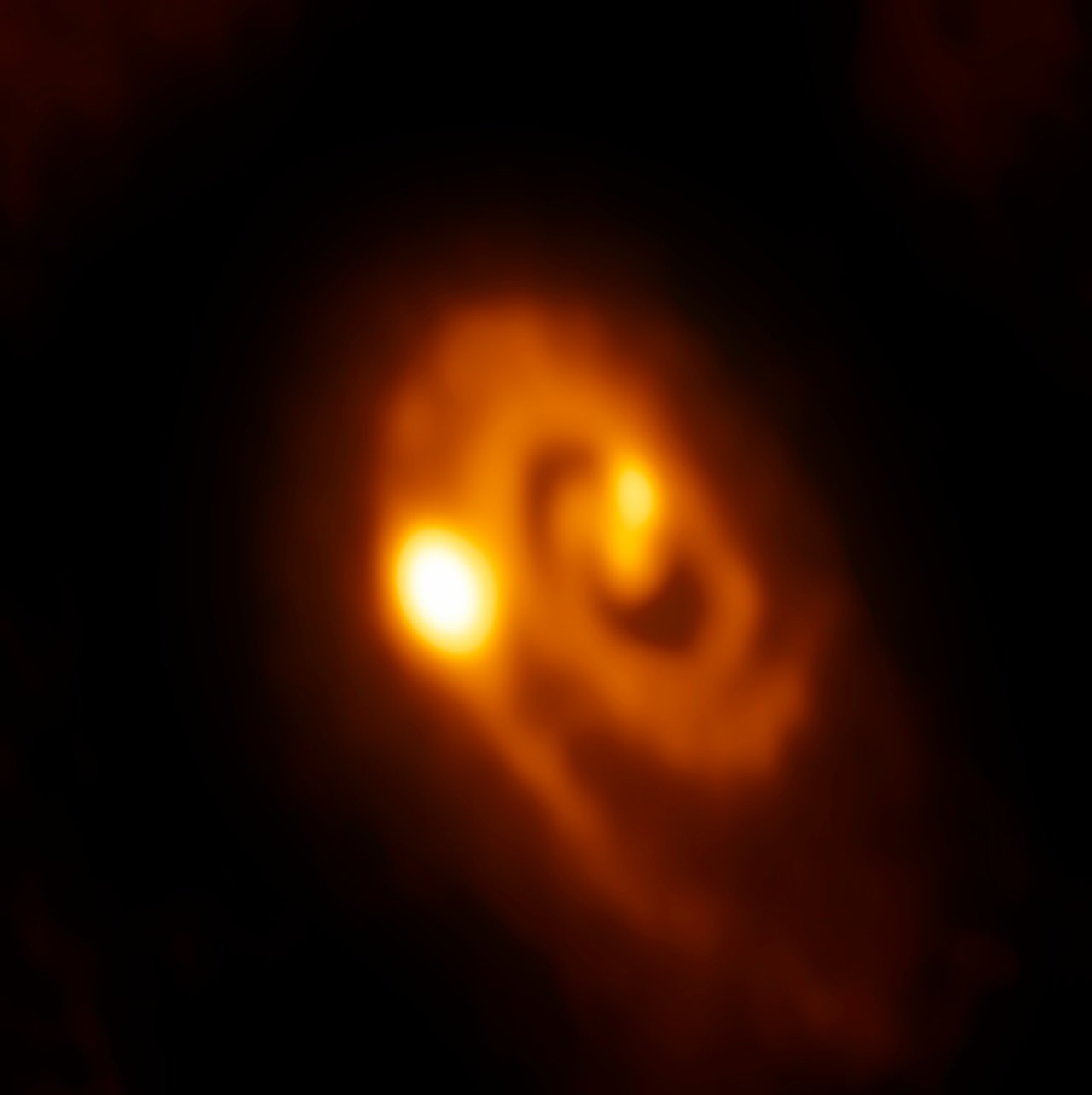
The triple protostar system IRS 3B and the disk of the system.

The source IRS 1 is a class I young stellar object and a binary. IRS 1 is more evolved than most of the protostars in this region and less well-studied.

The source IRS 2 is a binary that is very young (class 0 young stellar object), surrounded by a rotating disk and the system shows a bipolar outflow signature. The system has an hourglass shaped magnetic field that is aligned with the bipolar outflow. Towards the east is the source IRS 2E, a source between a pre-stellar core and a protostar.

The source IRS 3B was studied the most and ALMA showed that it is a triple protostar system with one star forming via disk fragmentation. The two outer stars are separated by 61 and 183 astronomical units from the central star and all three stars are surrounded by a circumstellar disk that shows spiral arms. IRS 3B is a class 0 young stellar object and might be younger than 150,000 years. The two protostellar objects in the center have a mass of about 1 M_{☉} and the protostar further from the center has a mass of about 0.085 M_{☉}. The disk that surrounds the three protostars has an estimated mass of about 0.30 M_{☉}. The sources IRS 3A, B and C show molecular outflows. IRS 3 is also called L1448N.

Another well-studied source in this region is called L1448-mm or L1448C. It is a class 0 young stellar object that drives a highly collimated flow, detected in carbon monoxide, Silicon monoxide and water.
