= California Nebula =

Emission nebula in the constellation Perseus

Emission nebula

Observation data: J2000.0 epoch
- Right ascension: 04^{h} 03^{m} 18.00^{s}
- Declination: +36° 25′ 18.0″
- Distance: 1300±160 ly (410±50 pc)
- Apparent magnitude (V): 6.0
- Apparent dimensions (V): 2.5° long
- Constellation: Perseus

Physical characteristics
- Radius: 22 ly
- Designations: NGC 1499, Sharpless 2-220

The California Nebula (also known as NGC 1499 or Sh 2-220) is an emission nebula located in the constellation Perseus. Its name comes from its resemblance in long exposure photographs to the outline of the U.S. state of California.

By coincidence, the California Nebula transits in the zenith in central California as the latitude matches the declination of the object.

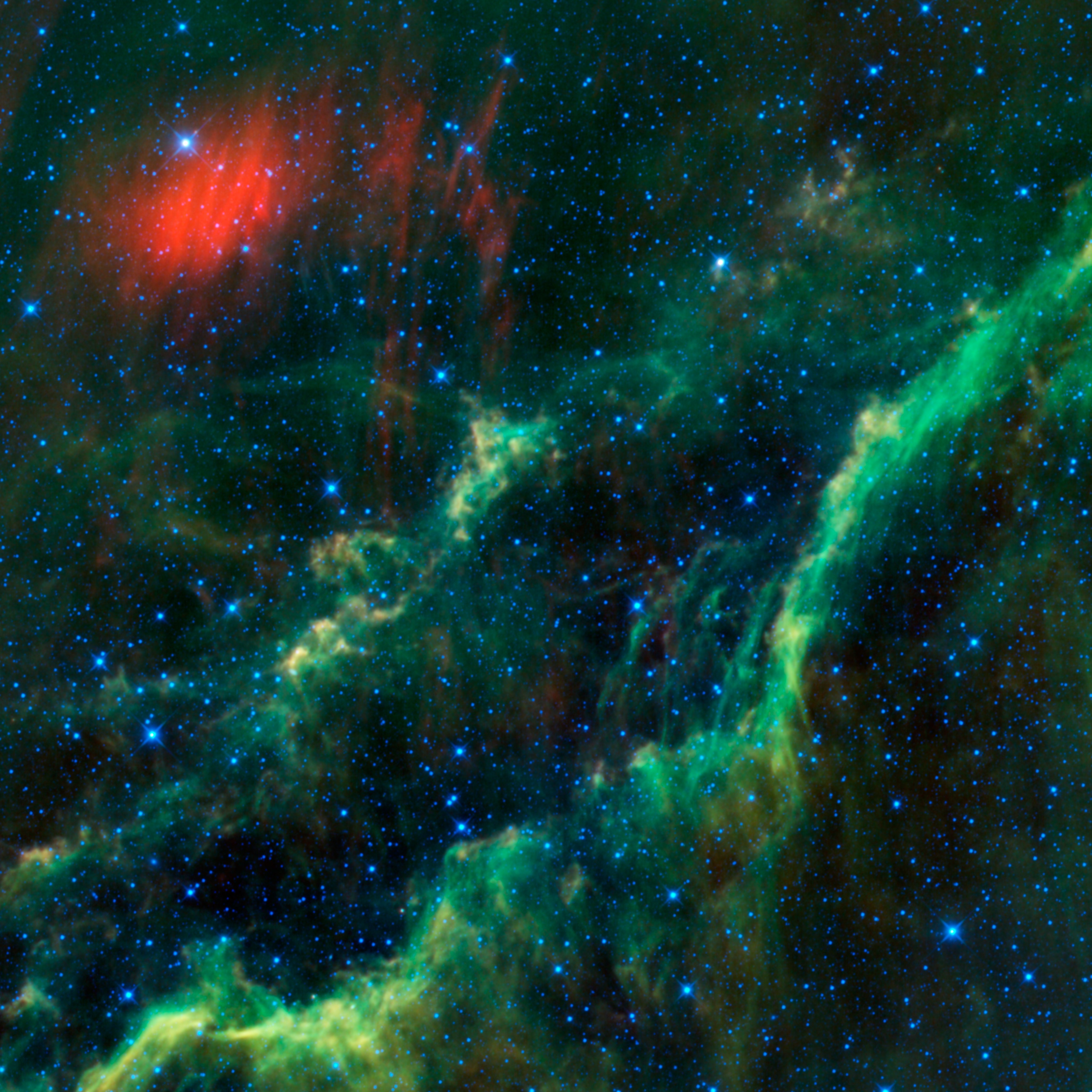
Infrared image showing Xi Persei's interaction with the nebula including a (red) shock wave in the gas and dust (upper left)

== Observation ==
NGC 1499 is almost 2.5° long on the sky and, because of its very low surface brightness, it is extremely difficult to observe visually. It can be observed with a Hα filter (isolates the Hα line at 656 nm) or Hβ filter (isolates the Hβ line at 486 nm) in a rich-field telescope under dark skies. It lies at a distance of about 1,000 light years from Earth. Its fluorescence is due to excitation of the Hβ line in the nebula by the nearby prodigiously energetic O7 star, Xi Persei (also known as Menkib).

Due to its large extent and apparent overlap in the sky with the Perseus–Pisces Supercluster, some galaxies can be seen behind the California Nebula. The brightest example is IC 2005, an elliptical galaxy 280 million light years away.

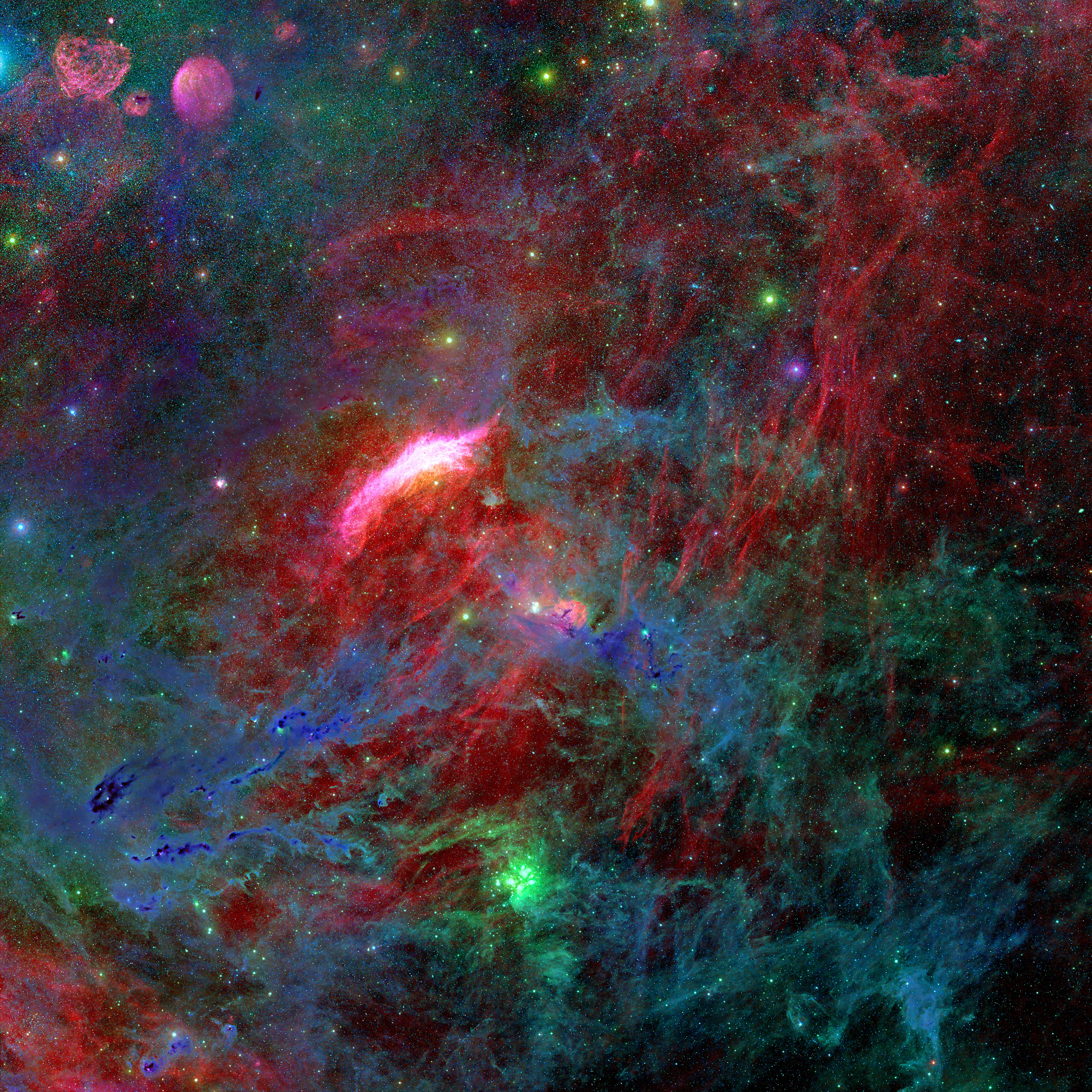
The region surrounding the California Nebula, as seen by the Northern Sky Narrowband Survey. The California Nebula (bright pinkish object in the center) appears to be the brightest part of a much larger structure (red) that is partially obscured by molecular clouds in Taurus and Perseus.

== Discovery ==
The California Nebula was discovered by E. E. Barnard in 1884.

Panoramic view of H-alpha emission in the California Nebula
