= L1448-IRS2E =

Star in the constellation Perseus

Observation data Epoch J2000.0 Equinox J2000.0 (ICRS)
- Constellation: Perseus
- Right ascension: 03^{h} 25^{m} 25.9^{s}
- Declination: +30° 45′ 03″

Other designations
- JCMTSE J032525.9+304502

Database references
SIMBAD	data

L1448-IRS2E is an object located in LDN 1448, being part of the Perseus molecular cloud. A clump of dense gas and dust, L1448-IRS2E is one-tenth as luminous as the Sun and thus is unlikely to be a true protostar at this time. However, its density is high enough that it is ejecting streams of matter from itself, and so it is a likely candidate for the first discovered core in hydrostatic quasi-equilibrium. This would mean that L1448-IRS2E represents an early phase in stellar development which has so far remained unobserved due to the short time that a star spends in this phase and the low luminosity which comes from a star not yet developed past it.
