= Embryo Nebula =

Embryo Nebula can refer to:

- NGC 1333, a nebula in Perseus
- Westerhout 5, a nebula in Cassiopeia
