= Xi Persei =

Star in the constellation Perseus

Menkib
- Location of ξ Persei (circled)

Observation data Epoch J2000 Equinox ICRS
- Constellation: Perseus
- Right ascension: 03^{h} 58^{m} 57.90229^{s}
- Declination: +35° 47′ 27.7132″
- Apparent magnitude (V): 4.04

Characteristics
- Spectral type: O7.5III(n)((f))
- U−B color index: −0.93
- B−V color index: +0.02
- Variable type: slightly variable

Astrometry
Radial velocity (R_{v})	65.40 km/s
Proper motion (μ)	RA: 3.62 mas/yr Dec.: 1.74 mas/yr
Parallax (π)	2.62±0.51 mas
Distance	approx. 1,200 ly (approx. 380 pc)
Absolute magnitude (M_{V})	−5.50

Details
Mass	26-36 M_{☉}
Radius	10.1±1.3 R_{☉}
Luminosity	263,000 L_{☉}
Surface gravity (log g)	3.5 cgs
Temperature	35,000 K
Rotational velocity (v sin i)	220 km/s
Age	~7 Myr

Other designations
- Menkib, 46 Per, HR 1228, HD 24912, FK5 148, SAO 56856, HIP 18614, BD+35°775

Database references
SIMBAD	data

Xi Persei (ξ Persei, abbreviated Xi Per, ξ Per), known also as Menkib /ˈmɛŋkɪb/, is a star in the constellation of Perseus. Based upon parallax measurements taken during the Hipparcos mission, it is approximately 1,200 light-years from the Sun.

== Nomenclature ==
ξ Persei (Latinised to Xi Persei) is the star's Bayer designation.

It bore the traditional name Menkib, Menchib, Menkhib or Al Mankib, from Mankib al Thurayya (Arabic for "shoulder" [of the Pleiades]). In 2016, the International Astronomical Union (IAU) organized a Working Group on Star Names (WGSN) to catalogue and standardize proper names for stars. The WGSN approved the name Menkib for this star on 12 September 2016 and it is now so included in the List of IAU-approved Star Names.

In Chinese, 卷舌 (Juǎn Shé), meaning Rolled Tongue, refers to an asterism consisting of Xi Persei, Nu Persei, Epsilon Persei, Zeta Persei, Omicron Persei and 40 Persei. Consequently, the Chinese name for Xi Persei itself is 卷舌三 (Juǎn Shé sān, "the Third Star of Rolled Tongue").

== Properties ==
Xi Persei has an apparent magnitude of +4.06 and is classified as a blue giant (spectral class O7.5III). It is intrinsically 12,700 times brighter than the Sun with absolute magnitude −5.5 in the V band. If the ultraviolet light and light from other wavelengths that emanates from Menkib is included, its total bolometric luminosity is 263,000 times that of the Sun.

The star has a mass of some 30 solar masses and a surface temperature of 35,000 kelvins, making it one of the hottest stars that can be seen with the naked eye. The fluorescence of the California Nebula (NGC 1499) is due to this star's prodigious radiation. It is a member of the Perseus OB2 association of co-moving stars, but may be a runaway star since it is now separated by 200 pc from the association's center and has an unusually high radial velocity.
