= Omicron Persei =

Triple star system in the constellation Perseus

ο Persei
- Location of ο Persei (circled red)

Observation data Epoch J2000 Equinox ICRS
- Constellation: Perseus
- A
- Right ascension: 03^{h} 44^{m} 19.13377^{s}
- Declination: +32° 17′ 17.6874″
- Apparent magnitude (V): 3.83
- B
- Right ascension: 03^{h} 44^{m} 19.17122^{s}
- Declination: +32° 17′ 18.5103″
- Apparent magnitude (V): 6.68

Characteristics

A
- Spectral type: B1III / B2V
- U−B color index: −0.75
- B−V color index: +0.05
- Variable type: ellipsoidal

Astrometry
Radial velocity (R_{v})	+12.20 km/s
Absolute magnitude (M_{V})	−4.4

A
Proper motion (μ)	RA: +6.091 mas/yr Dec.: −9.732 mas/yr
Parallax (π)	3.0224±0.3827 mas
Distance	approx. 1,100 ly (approx. 330 pc)

Orbit
Primary	Aa
Secondary	Ab
Period (P)	4.4191447 days
Semi-major axis (a)	33 R_{☉}
Eccentricity (e)	0.0
Inclination (i)	39±15°
Semi-amplitude (K_{1}) (primary)	111.8 km/s
Semi-amplitude (K_{2}) (secondary)	155.0 km/s

Details

Aa
Mass	14 M_{☉}
Radius	9.6 R_{☉}
Surface gravity (log g)	3.4 cgs
Temperature	22,700 K
Rotational velocity (v sin i)	70±5 km/s

Ab
Mass	10 M_{☉}
Radius	8.9 R_{☉}
Surface gravity (log g)	4.0 cgs
Temperature	21,000 K
Rotational velocity (v sin i)	65±15 km/s
Age	15 Myr

Other designations
- Atik, 38 Persei, ADS 2726 AB, BD+31°642, CCDM J03443+3217AB, GC 4461, GSC 02359-01258, HIP 17448, HR 1131, HD 23180, SAO 56673, WDS J03443+3217AB

Database references
SIMBAD	data

Omicron Persei (ο Persei, abbreviated omi Per, ο Per) is a triple star system in the constellation of Perseus. From parallax measurements taken during the Hipparcos mission it is approximately 1,100 light-years (330 parsecs) from the Sun.

The system consists of a spectroscopic binary pair designated Omicron Persei A and a third companion Omicron Persei B. A's two components are themselves designated Omicron Persei Aa (officially named Atik /ˈeɪtɪk/, the traditional name of the system) and Ab.

It is optically located close to IC 348, also known as the O Persei Cluster.

== Etymology ==
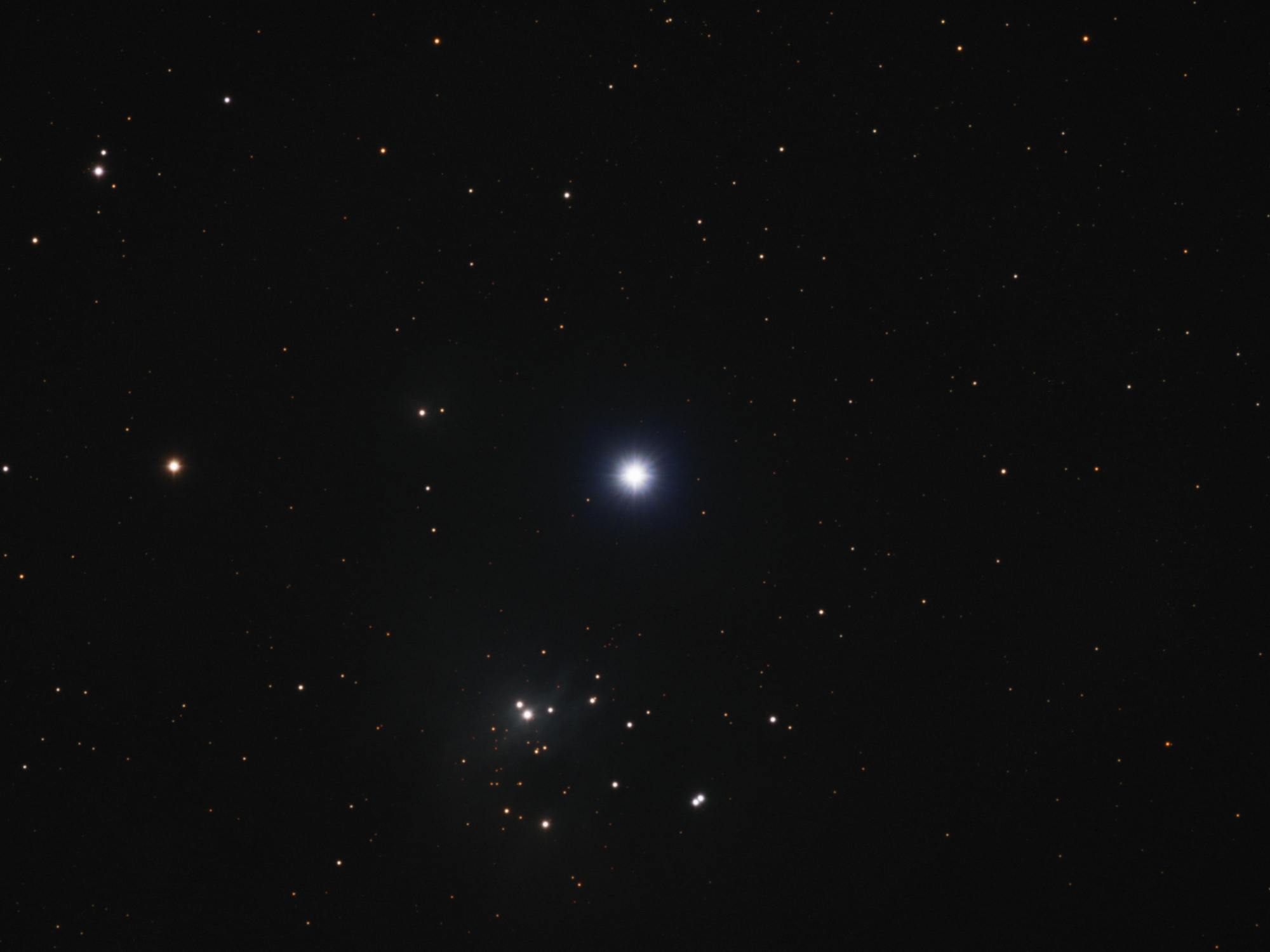
ο Persei in optical light

ο Persei (Latinised to Omicron Persei) is the system's Bayer designation. The designations of the two constituents as Omicron Persei A and B, and those of A's components - Omicron Persei Aa and Ab - derive from the convention used by the Washington Multiplicity Catalog (WMC) for multiple star systems, and adopted by the International Astronomical Union (IAU).

It bore the traditional name Atik (also Ati, Al Atik), Arabic for "the shoulder". Some sources attribute the name Atik to the nearby, brighter star Zeta Persei. In 2016, the International Astronomical Union organized a Working Group on Star Names (WGSN) to catalogue and standardize proper names for stars. The WGSN decided to attribute proper names to individual stars rather than entire multiple systems. It approved the name Atik for the component Omicron Persei A on 12 September 2016 and it is now so included in the List of IAU-approved Star Names.

In Chinese, 卷舌 (Juǎn Shé), meaning Rolled Tongue, refers to an asterism consisting of Omicron Persei, Nu Persei, Epsilon Persei, Xi Persei, Zeta Persei and 40 Persei. Consequently, the Chinese name for Omicron Persei itself is 卷舌五 (Juǎn Shé wu), "the Fifth Star of Rolled Tongue".

== Properties ==
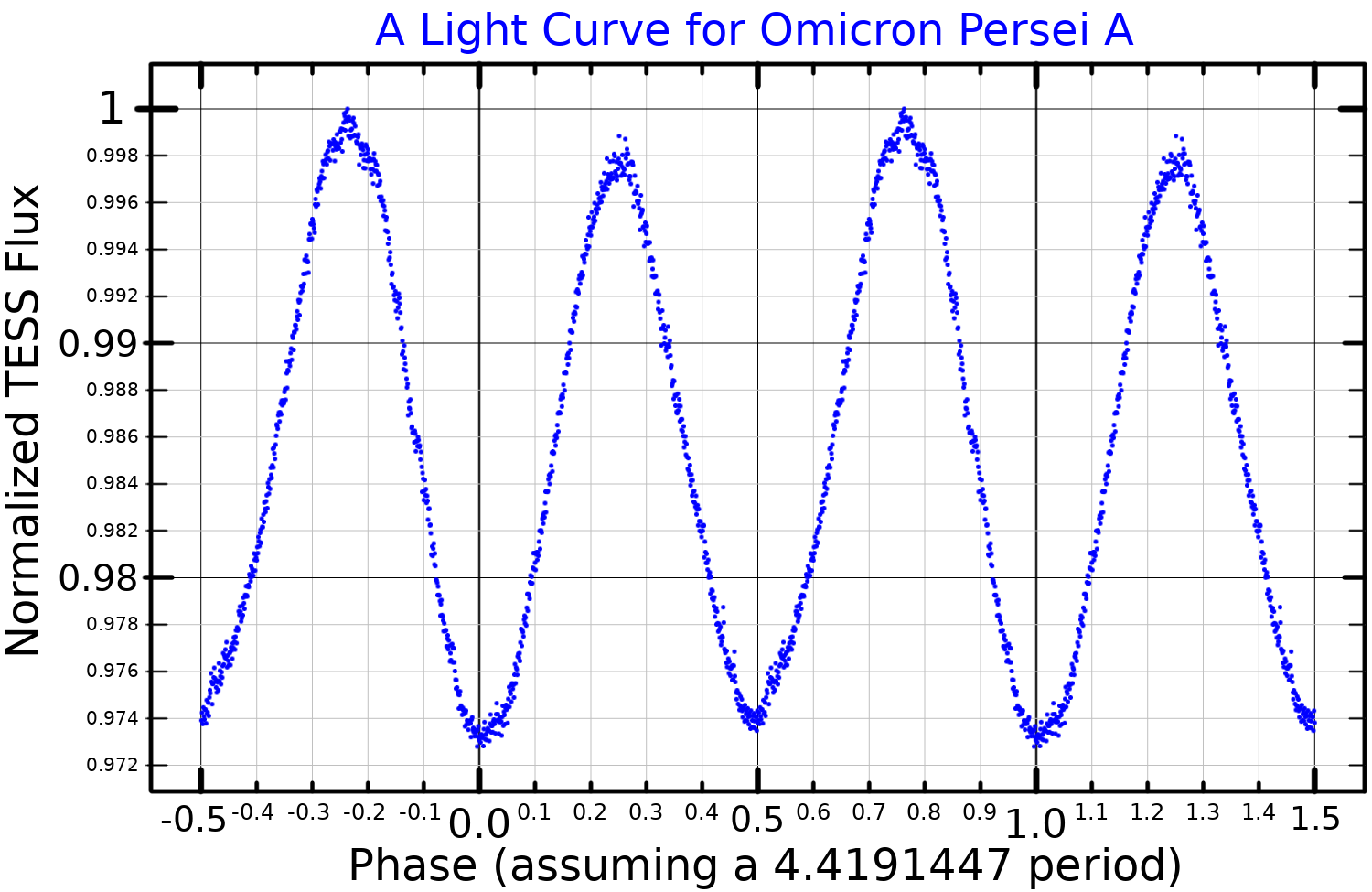
A light curve for Omicron Persei A, plotted from TESS data

Omicron Persei A is a spectroscopic binary consisting of a spectral type B1 giant and a type B2 dwarf orbiting each other every 4.4 days. The orbit is near-circular although its inclination is not precisely known. The two stars are separated by approximately 33 R_{☉}, the exact value depending on the inclination. The primary is approximately one magnitude brighter than the secondary at visual wavelengths. The binary pair forms a rotating ellipsoidal variable star, which varies in brightness from visual magnitude 3.79 to 3.88 during the orbital period.

Omicron Persei lies just north of the open cluster IC 348, but is not catalogued as a member. Both IC 348 and Omicron Persei belong to the Perseus OB2 association.

== Culture ==
- In the TV series Futurama, the fictional planet Omicron Persei 8 is home to medicinal plants and reptilian extraterrestrials who often attack Earth.
- The USS Atik, named for Omicron Persei Aa, was a ship of the United States Navy.
