= SuWt 2 =

Planetary nebula

Emission nebula
- Planetary nebula
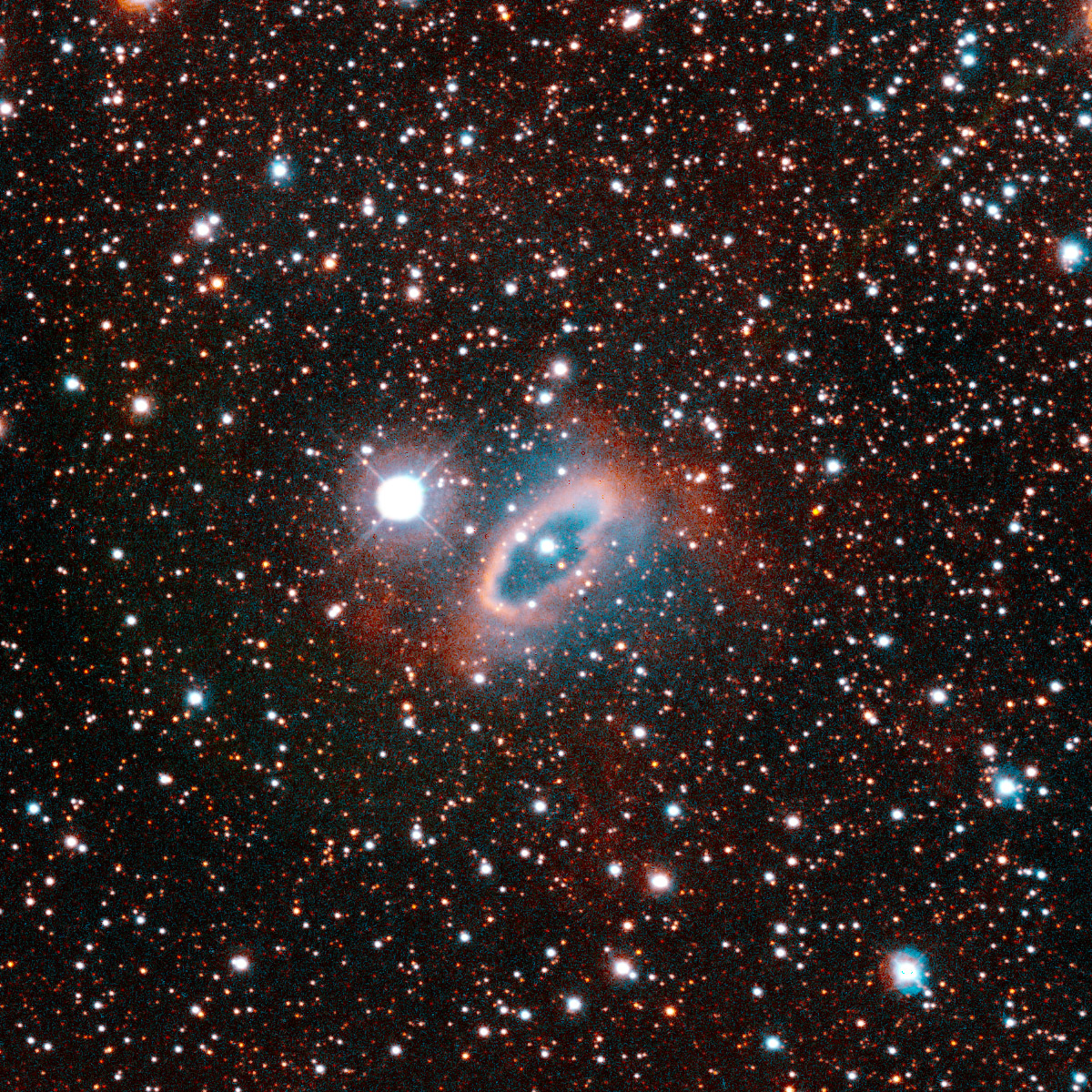
- Image of SuWt 2 taken from the Cerro Tololo Inter-American Observatory.

Observation data: J2000 epoch
- Right ascension: 13^{h} 55^{m} 43.23^{s}
- Declination: −59° 22′ 40.03″
- Distance: 6,500 ly
- Apparent magnitude (V): 11.52
- Constellation: Centaurus
- Designations: PN G311.0+02.4, DENIS J135543.2-592239, GSC 08676-01161, 2MASS J13554323-5922398, PK 311+02 2

SuWt 2 is a planetary nebula viewed almost edge-on in the constellation of Centaurus. It is believed that high UV radiation from an undiscovered white dwarf ionizes this nebula. Currently, there is a binary system consisting of two A-type main-sequence stars whose radiation is not sufficient to photo-ionize the surrounding nebula. The nebula is easily obscured by the brighter star, HD 121228.

It has been suggested that it has a triple stellar system. One of them, which is more massive than other two A-type main-sequence stars, evolved rapidly and became a red giant, swallowing the other two stars, and produced the planetary nebula.
