= Pulsed accretion =

Periodic modulation of stellar accretion rate

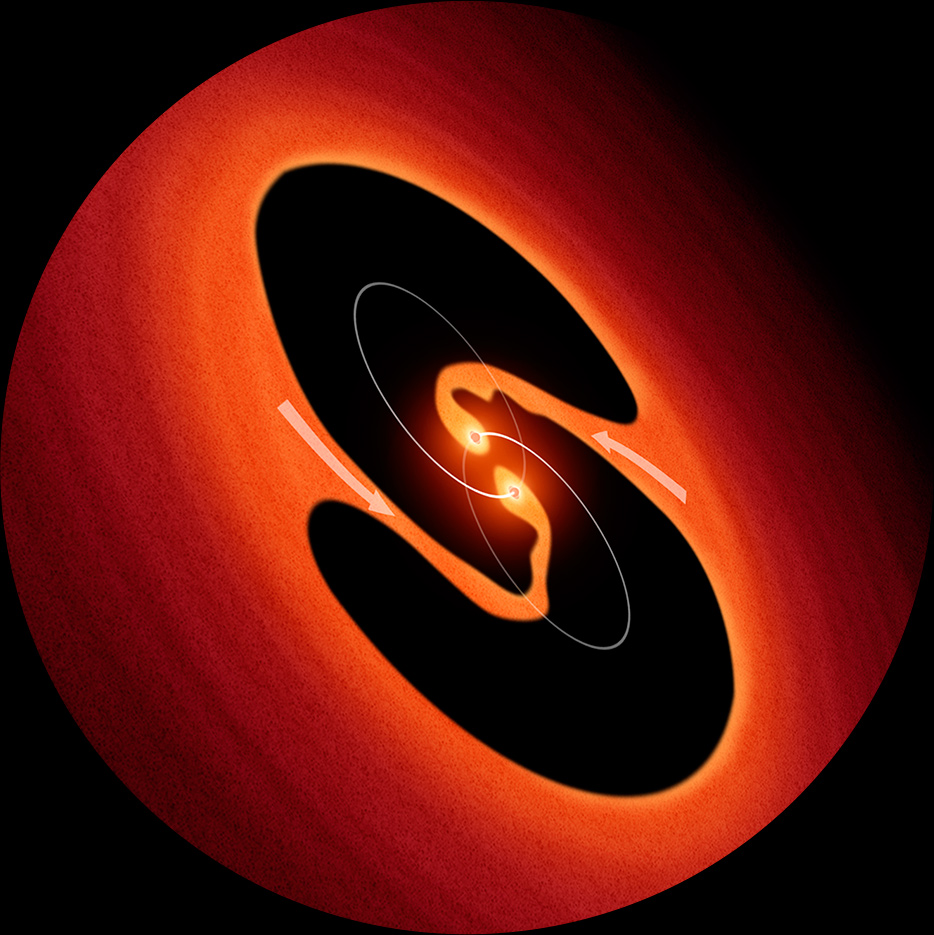
Artist's impression of a young binary star system at periastron

In astronomy, pulsed accretion is the periodic modulation in accretion rate of young stellar objects in binary systems, producing a periodic pulse in the observed infrared light curves of T Tauri stars.

In double stars in young stellar objects, a protoplanetary disk is formed around each star, accreted from nearby matter. In such a binary star system, a strongly eccentric orbit produces strong gravitational forces on the circumstellar disks at periastron, and such disturbance can lead to a temporary increase in the accretion rate onto both stars. Simulations show that the accretion rate is likely to be highly symmetric between stars in nearly equal-mass binary systems but for systems with a mass disparity can be asymmetric. Such asymmetry may be attributable to a high eccentricity circumbinary disk which can accrete material onto the surface of one star at a rate 10-20 times greater than onto the other, with the star that experiences a higher rate of accretion alternating with its companion over large time scales.

This increased accretion rate leads to a change of intensity in the infrared radiation emitted by the stars with such intensity rising by up to tenfold in the protostar LRLL 54361. Brightness changes in the light curve that have the same period as the orbital period of the binary system, are usually assumed to be due to pulsed accretion.
