= HD 121228 =

Star in the constellation Centaurus

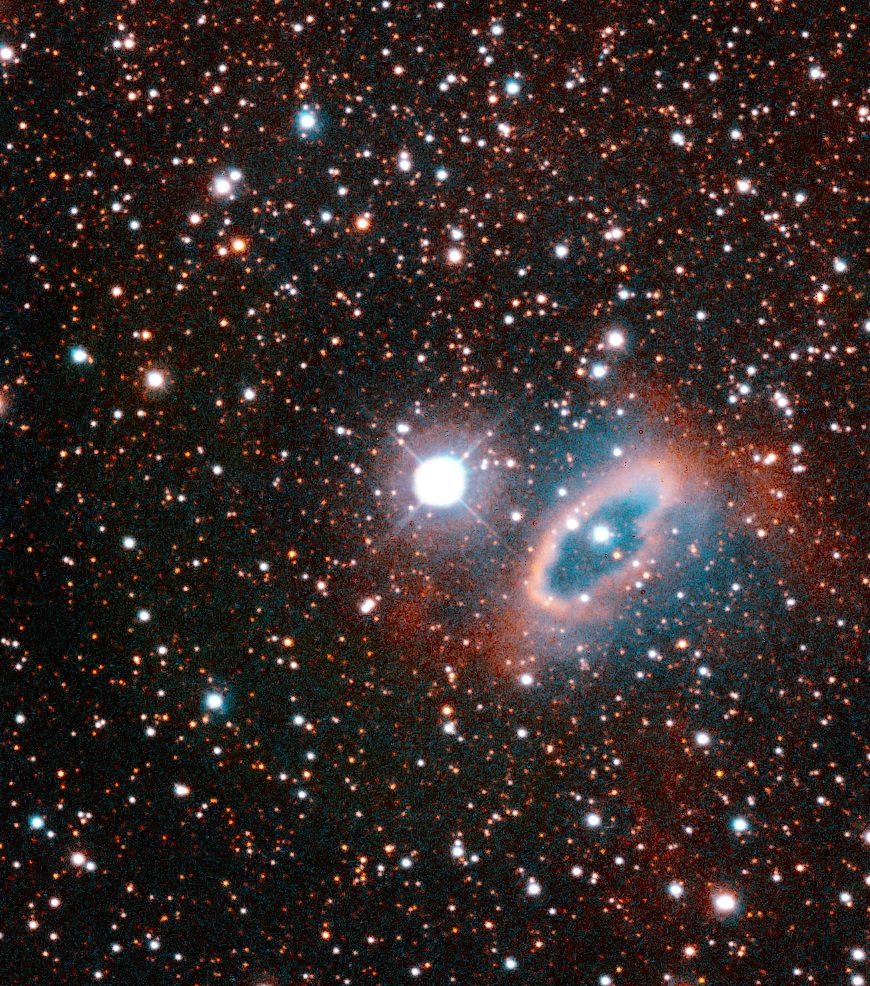

Observation data Epoch J2000 Equinox ICRS
- Constellation: Centaurus
- Right ascension: 13^{h} 55^{m} 52.322^{s}
- Declination: −59° 22′ 16.45″
- Apparent magnitude (V): 7.86

Characteristics
- Spectral type: B1 Ib
- Apparent magnitude (U): 7.34
- Apparent magnitude (B): 8.00
- Apparent magnitude (V): 7.86
- Apparent magnitude (R): 8.88
- Apparent magnitude (G): 7.7591
- Apparent magnitude (J): 7.428
- Apparent magnitude (H): 7.426
- Apparent magnitude (K): 7.385

Astrometry
Proper motion (μ)	RA: −3.376 mas/yr Dec.: −1.300 mas/yr
Parallax (π)	0.5846±0.0260 mas
Distance	5,600 ± 200 ly (1,710 ± 80 pc)
Absolute magnitude (M_{V})	−5.32

Details
Mass	7.0 M_{☉}
Radius	19.6 R_{☉}
Luminosity	4,124 L_{☉}
Surface gravity (log g)	2.14 cgs
Temperature	26,424 K
Age	31.6 Myr

Other designations
- CD−58°5362, HIP 68034, SAO 241302

Database references
SIMBAD	data

HD 121228 is a blue supergiant star located in the constellation Centaurus. The star is noted for its close visual proximity to the planetary nebula SuWt 2.

== See also ==
- Zeta Persei - Same spectral class
