= LRLL 54361 =

Star in the constellation Perseus

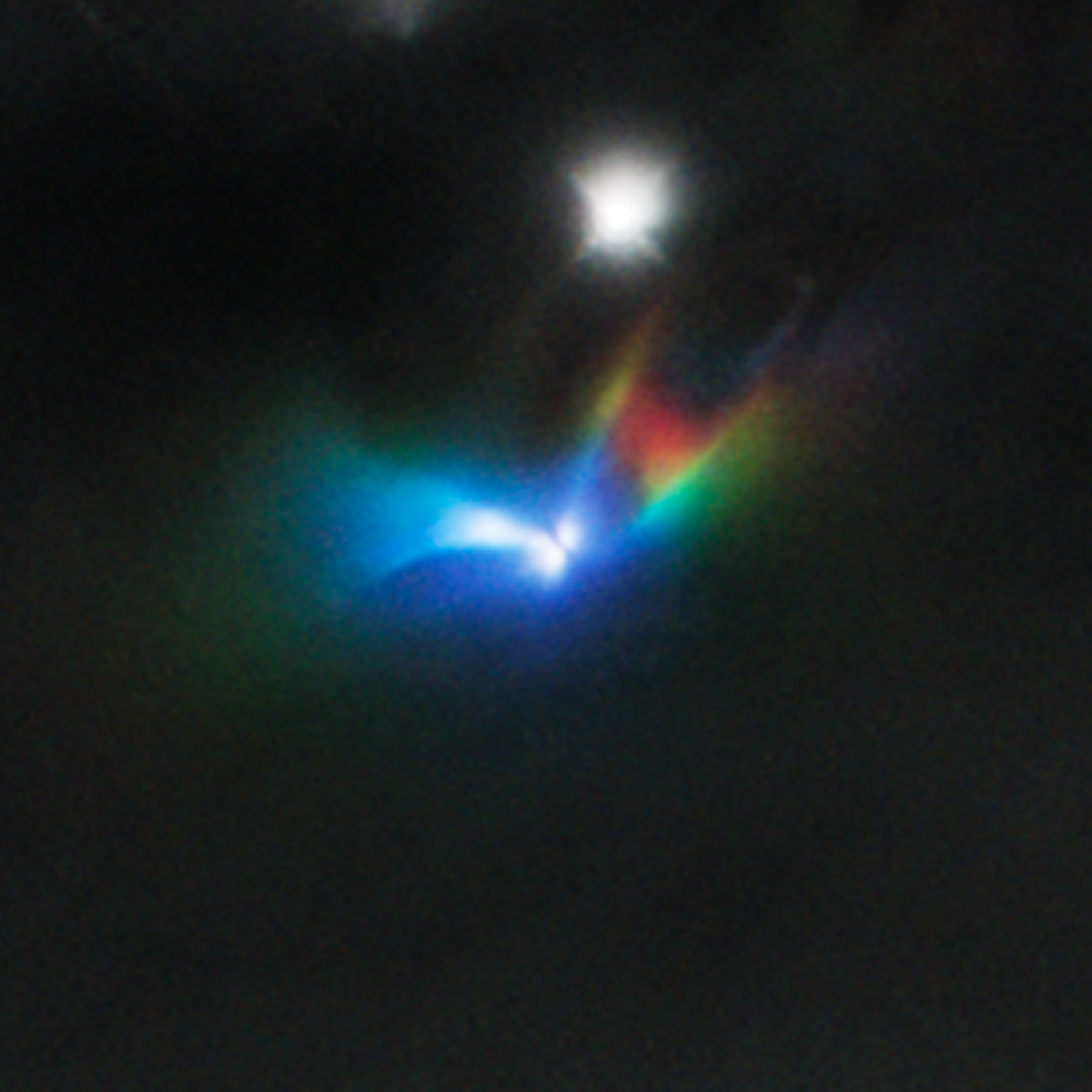
- Close up of LRLL 54361 with Hubble

Observation data Epoch J2000 Equinox ICRS
- Constellation: Perseus
- Right ascension: 03^{h} 43^{m} 51.02^{s}
- Declination: +32° 03′ 08.1″

Astrometry
Distance	950 ly (290 pc)

Database references
SIMBAD	data

LRLL 54361 also known as L54361 and Per-emb 28 is an astronomical object thought to be a binary protostar producing strobe-like flashes, located in the constellation Perseus in the star-forming region IC 348 and 950 light-years away.

The object may offer insight into a star's early stages of formation, when large masses of gas and dust are falling into a newly forming binary star - called a pulsed accretion model. LRLL 54361 emits a burst of light at regular intervals of 25.34 days, increasing in infrared luminosity by an order of magnitude over a span of a week and then gradually dimming until the next pulse. This behavior be caused by repeated close approaches between the two component stars which are gravitationally linked in an eccentric orbit. The flashes may be the result of large amounts of matter falling into the growing protostars. Since the stars are obscured by the dense disk and envelope of dust surrounding them, direct observation is difficult. This process of star birth has been witnessed in its later stages, but has to date not been seen in such a young system, nor with such intensity and regularity. The pair of stars are thought to be only a few hundred thousand years old.

LRLL 54361 was first detected by the Spitzer Space Telescope as a variable object inside the star-forming region IC 348. The Hubble Space Telescope confirmed the Spitzer observations and revealed the detailed structure around the protostar. Hubble images show two large, clear-swept regions in the disk around the stars. The monitoring of LRLL 54361 continues using other instruments, including the Herschel Space Telescope, and astronomers hope to obtain more direct measurements of the binary star and its orbit.

Later the object was also detected as a radio source with the Very Large Array (VLA) and named JVLA 1. Researchers observed unprecedented variations in the far-infrared with Herschel. The observations showed that the disk and envelope of the source are periodically heated by the accretion pulses. Additional VLA observations showed that the radio emission is steady and does not follow the infrared variability. The researchers suggest that the radio traces an ionized outflow. The source forms a wide multiple system together with Per-emb 16. Observations of Per-emb 28 (here called Perseus 3) with Akari detected deep crystalline H_{2}O and XCN ice features. Observations with ALMA only detected weak CS, but no other molecule.

== Gallery ==
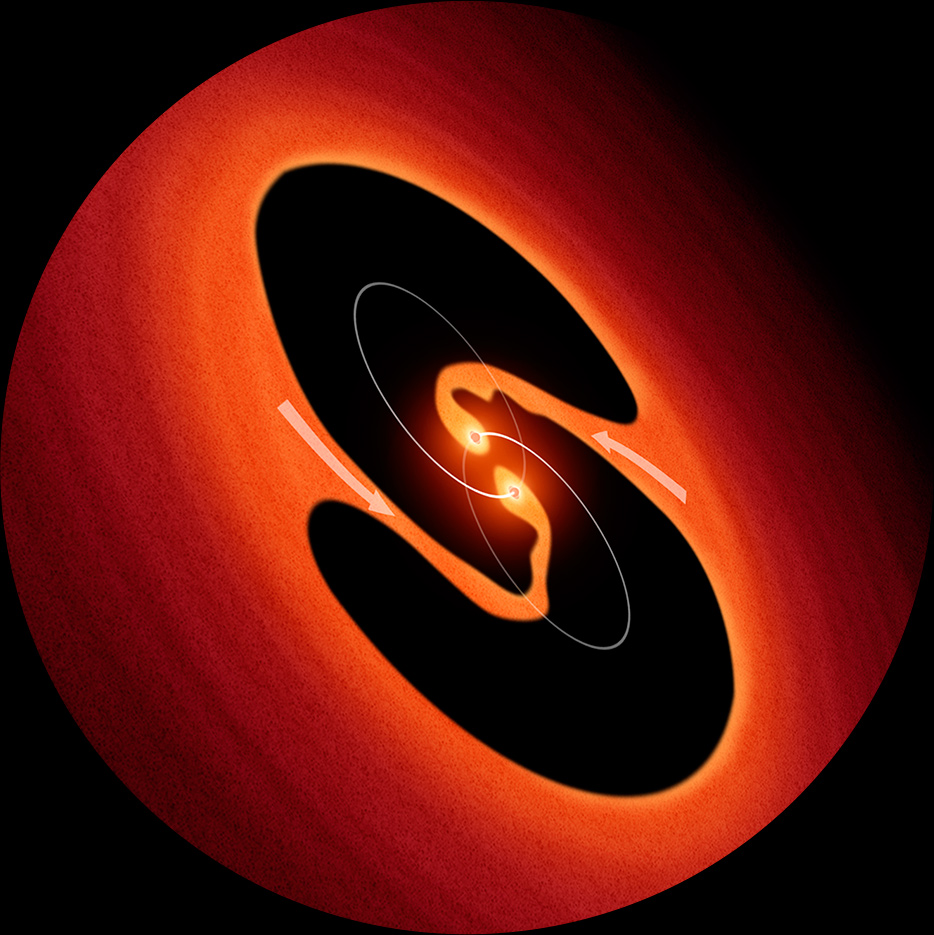
Schematic diagram of the young binary star system

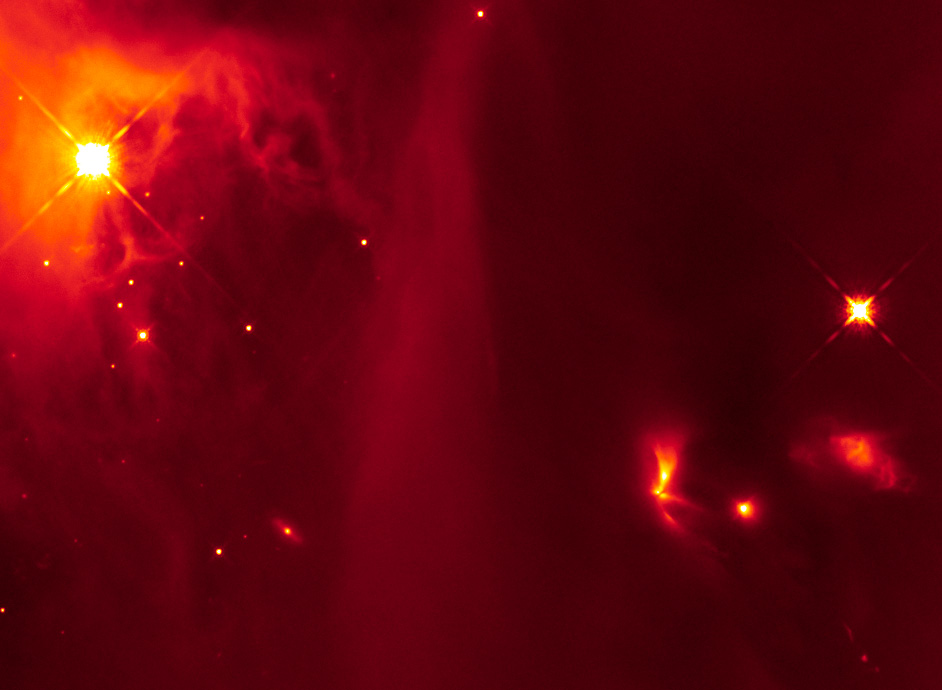
Infrared image of LRLL 54361 (center right)

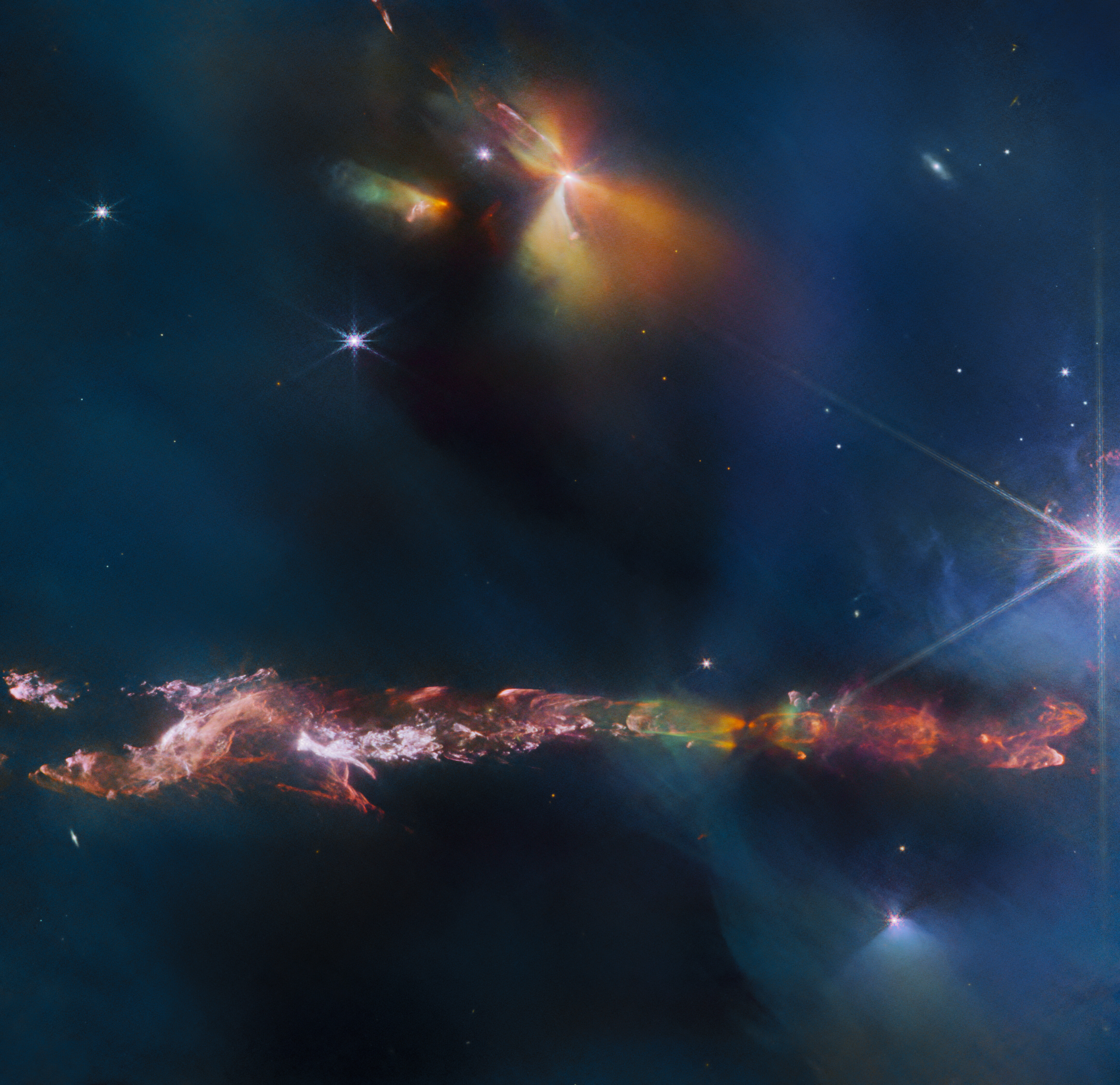
JWST NIRCam image of LRLL 54361 (top) and HH 797A (bottom). Left of LRLL 54361 is Per-emb 16.
