= Zeta Persei =

Star in the constellation Perseus

ζ Persei
- Location of ζ Persei (circled)

Observation data Epoch J2000 Equinox J2000
- Constellation: Perseus
- Right ascension: 03^{h} 54^{m} 07.92143^{s}
- Declination: +31° 53′ 01.0869″
- Apparent magnitude (V): 2.86

Characteristics
- Evolutionary stage: Blue supergiant
- Spectral type: B1 Ib
- U−B color index: –0.72
- B−V color index: +0.10

Astrometry
Radial velocity (R_{v})	20.1 ± 1.2 km/s
Proper motion (μ)	RA: +7.274 mas/yr Dec.: –9.141 mas/yr
Parallax (π)	3.8556±0.4169 mas
Distance	1,300±200 ly (400±64 pc)
Absolute magnitude (M_{V})	−4.55±0.1

Details
Mass	14.5 ± 1.9 M_{☉}
Radius	26–27 R_{☉}
Luminosity	47,039 L_{☉}
Temperature	20,800 K
Rotational velocity (v sin i)	40 km/s
Age	12.6 ± 1.5 Myr

Other designations
- ζ Per, 44 Per, BD+31 666, FK5 144, HD 24398, HIP 18246, HR 1203, SAO 56799

Database references
SIMBAD	data

Zeta Persei (ζ Per, ζ Persei) is a star in the northern constellation of Perseus. With an apparent visual magnitude of 2.9, it can be readily seen with the naked eye. Parallax measurements place it at a distance of about 846 light-years (259 parsecs) from Earth, though measurements of its Ca II lines place it at 1,300 light-years (400 parsecs).

== Nomenclature ==
Zeta Persei (Latinized from ζ Persei, abbreviated ζ Per) is the star's Bayer designation.

Zeta Persei and the nearby Omicron Persei traditionally shared the name Atik, from the Arabic 'atiq al-Thurayya, "the collarbone of the Pleiades". Some sources attribute the name Atik to Zeta Persei, but it has been assigned to Omicron Persei by the IAU.

== Description ==
This is a lower luminosity supergiant star with a stellar classification of B1 Ib. This is an enormous star, with an estimated 26–27 times the Sun's radius and 13–16 times the Sun's mass. It has about 47,000 times the luminosity of the Sun and it is radiating this energy at an effective temperature of 20,800 K, giving it the blue-white hue of a B-type star. The spectrum displays anomalously high levels of carbon. Zeta Persei has a strong stellar wind that is expelling 0.23×10^{−6} times the mass of the Sun per year, or the equivalent of the Sun's mass every 4.3 million years.

Zeta Persei has a 9th magnitude companion at an angular separation of 12.9 arcseconds. The two stars have the same proper motion, so they may be physically associated. If so, they are separated by at least 4,000 Astronomical Units. Zeta Persei is a confirmed member of the Perseus OB2 association (Per OB2), also called the Zeta Persei association, which is a moving group of stars that includes 17 massive, high luminosity members with spectral types of O or B, giving them a blue hue. These stars have a similar trajectory through space, suggesting they originated in the same molecular cloud and are about the same age.

== See also ==
- HD 121228 - Same spectral class
