= NGC 1333 =

Reflection nebula in the constellation Perseus

Reflection nebula
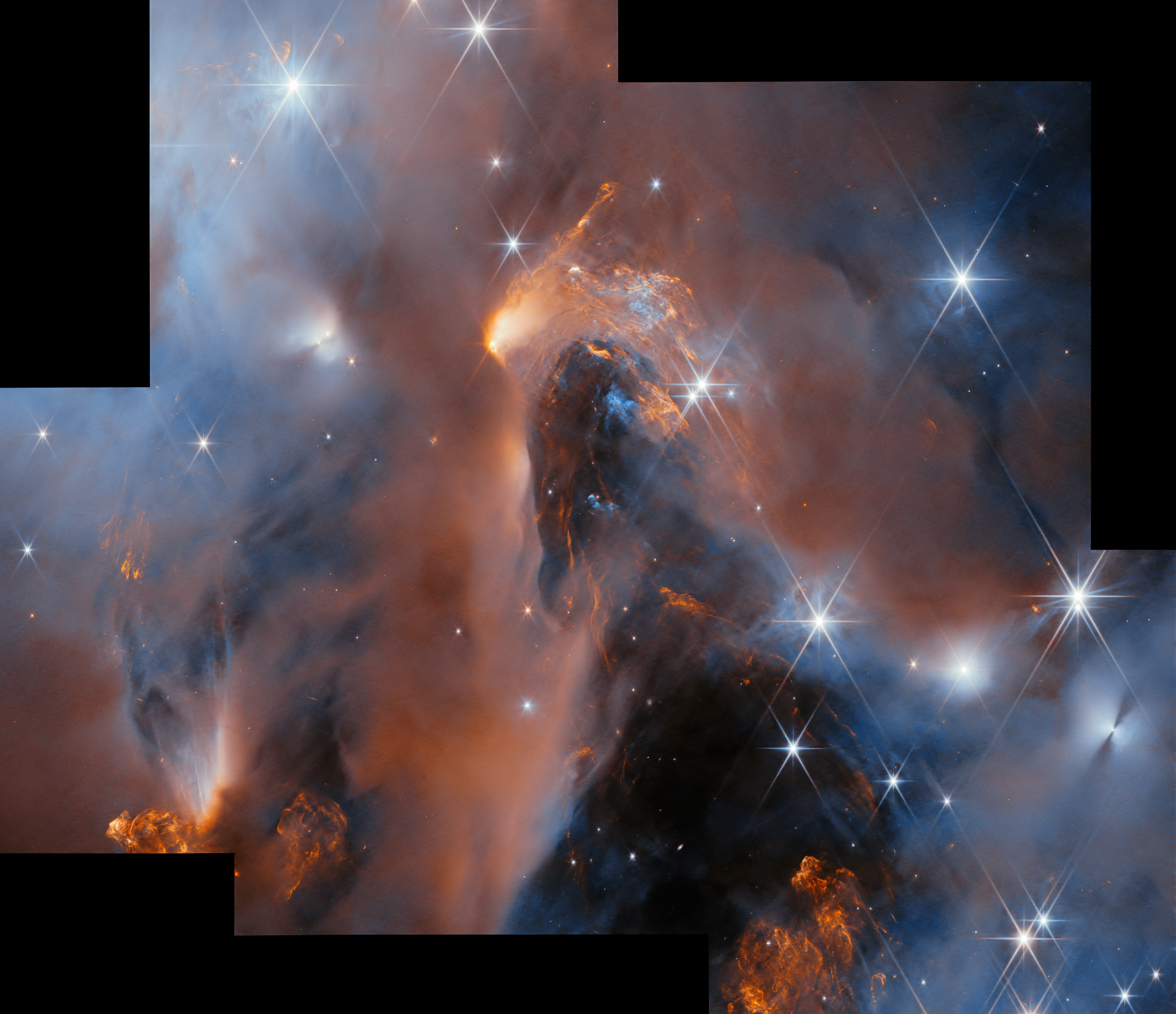
- JWST NIRISS image of part of NGC 1333, with the Herbig-Haro object HH 12 at its center. On the right side in the lower half of the image is ASR 41, which has a young star with a disk that casts a shadow into the surrounding dusty medium.

Observation data: J2000.0 epoch
- Right ascension: 03^{h} 29^{m} 11.3^{s}
- Declination: +31° 18′ 36″
- Distance: 967 ly (296.5 pc) ly
- Apparent magnitude (V): 5.6
- Apparent dimensions (V): 6′ x 3′
- Constellation: Perseus
- Designations: Ced 16, GN 03.26.1, LBN 741

NGC 1333, also known as the Embryo Nebula and Phantom Tiara Nebula, is a reflection nebula located in the northern constellation Perseus, positioned next to the southern constellation border with Taurus and Aries. It was first discovered by German astronomer Eduard Schönfeld in 1855. The nebula is visible as a hazy patch in a small telescope, while a larger aperture will show a pair of dark nebulae designated Barnard 1 and Barnard 2. It is associated with a dark cloud L1450 (Barnard 205). Estimates of the distance to this nebula range from 980–1,140 ly (300–350 pc).

This nebula is in the western part of the Perseus molecular cloud and is a young region of very active star formation, being one of the best-studied objects of its type. It contains a fairly typical hierarchy of star clusters that are still embedded in the molecular cloud in which they formed, which are split into two main sub-groups to the north and south. Most of the infrared emission is happening in the southern part of the nebula. A significant portion of the stars seen in the infrared are in the pre-main sequence stage of their evolution.

The nebula region has a combined mass of approximately 450 M_{☉}, while the cluster contains around 150 stars with a median age of a million years and a combined mass of 100 M_{☉}. The average star formation rate is 1×10^{−4} M_{☉} yr^{–1}. Within the nebula are 20 young stellar objects producing outflows, including Herbig–Haro objects, and a total of 95 X-ray sources that are associated with known members of embedded star clusters. In 2011 researchers reported finding 30 to 40 brown dwarf objects in the cloud and in the Rho Ophiuchi cloud complex.

15 objects with a spectral type of M9 or later were discovered in NGC 1333. This spectral type corresponds to a mass of a planetary-mass object (PMO) at the age of NGC 1333. About 42% of the PMOs are surrounded by a circumstellar disk, but only one out of six objects with a spectral type of L0 (about 10 M_{J}) or later has a disk. Scholz et al. argues that this indicates that very low mass PMOs form like planets (aka ejected planets) and not like stars (also called sub-brown dwarfs). Parker & Alves de Oliveira on the other hand argue that the distribution of PMOs in NGC 1333 follows N-body simulations of objects that form like stars and that none of the PMOs has a peculiar motion, which is predicted for ejected planets. They also note that ejected planets are hiding in this and other star-forming regions. Additional PMOs were discovered by Scholz et al. 2012 with Subaru (e.g. SONYC-NGC1333-36 with estimated 6 M_{J}) and by Langeveld et al. 2024 with JWST (6 objects and one JuMBO candidate). Langeveld et al. did not find any object below 4 M_{J}, despite JWST being sensitive enough to detect these objects. This could mean that star-formation does not occur below 4 M_{J}, which is consistent with previous observations in most star-forming regions and the nearby stellar population. One source, called NIRISS-NGC1333-5 (NN5), shows infrared excess, which is an indication of a disk around the object. With a mass of 5 M_{J}, this object could be one of the lowest mass object with a disk known so far.

== Gallery ==
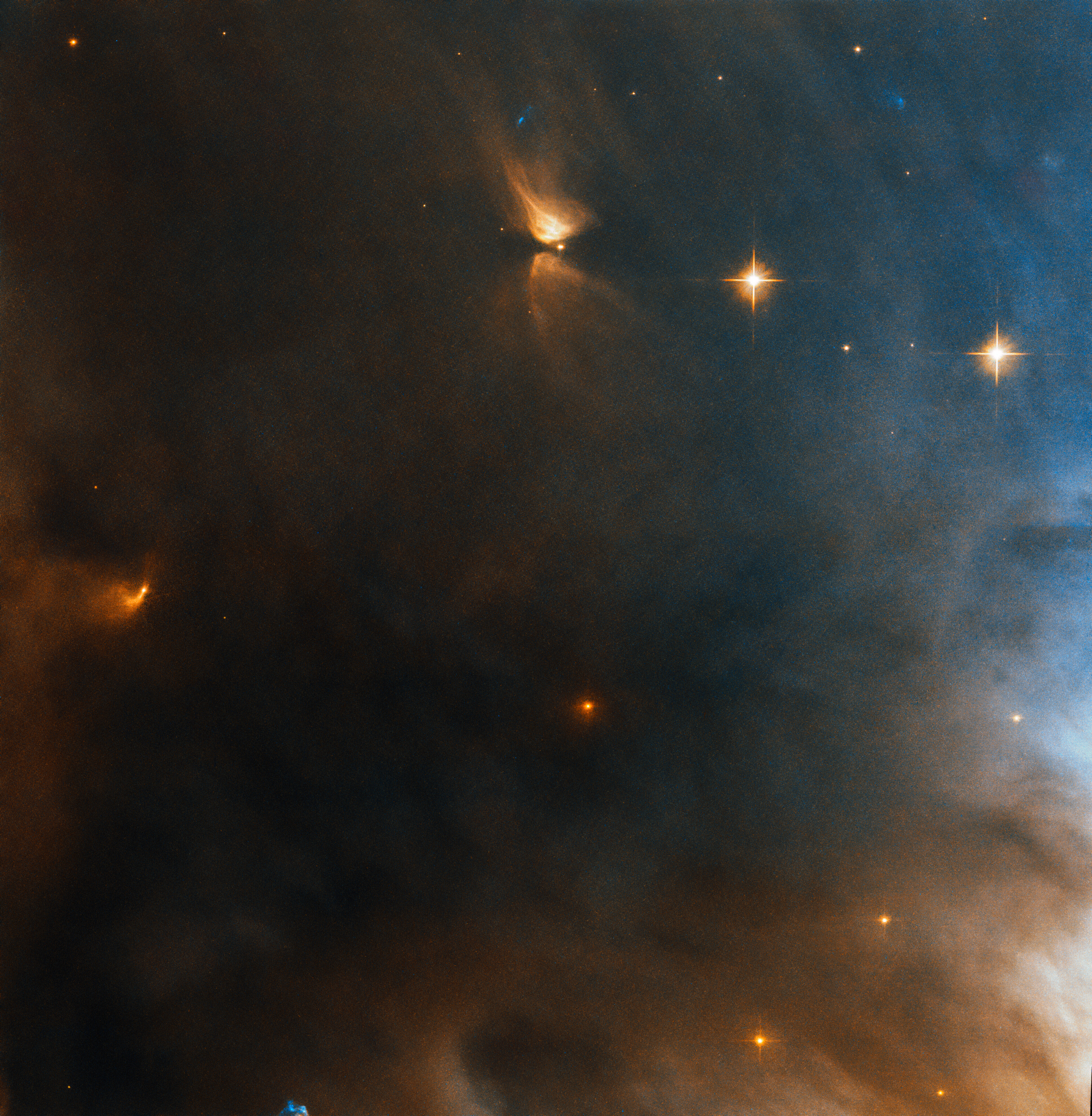
A small region of NGC 1333 taken by Hubble Space Telescope. The bi-polar object in the upper part is HH 4

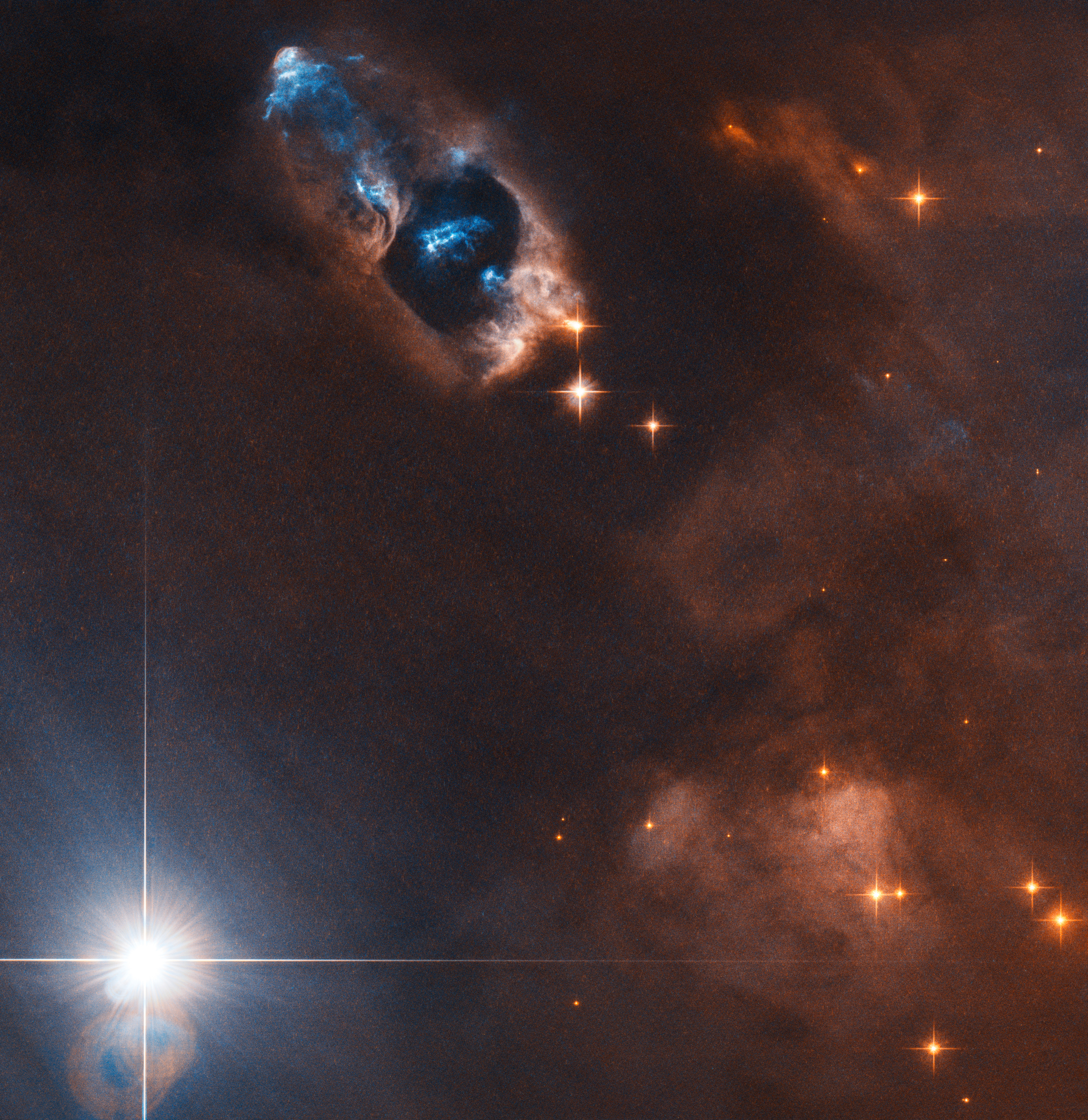
There are 5 Herbig–Haro objects (numbered 7 to 11) in this image, which are located in the southern part of NGC 1333.

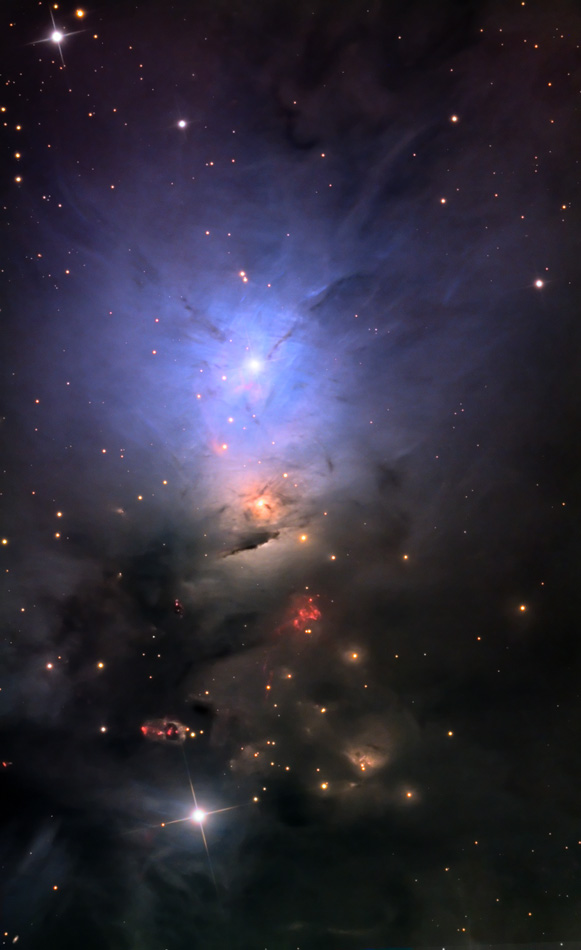
NGC 1333 by the Mount Lemmon Sky Center

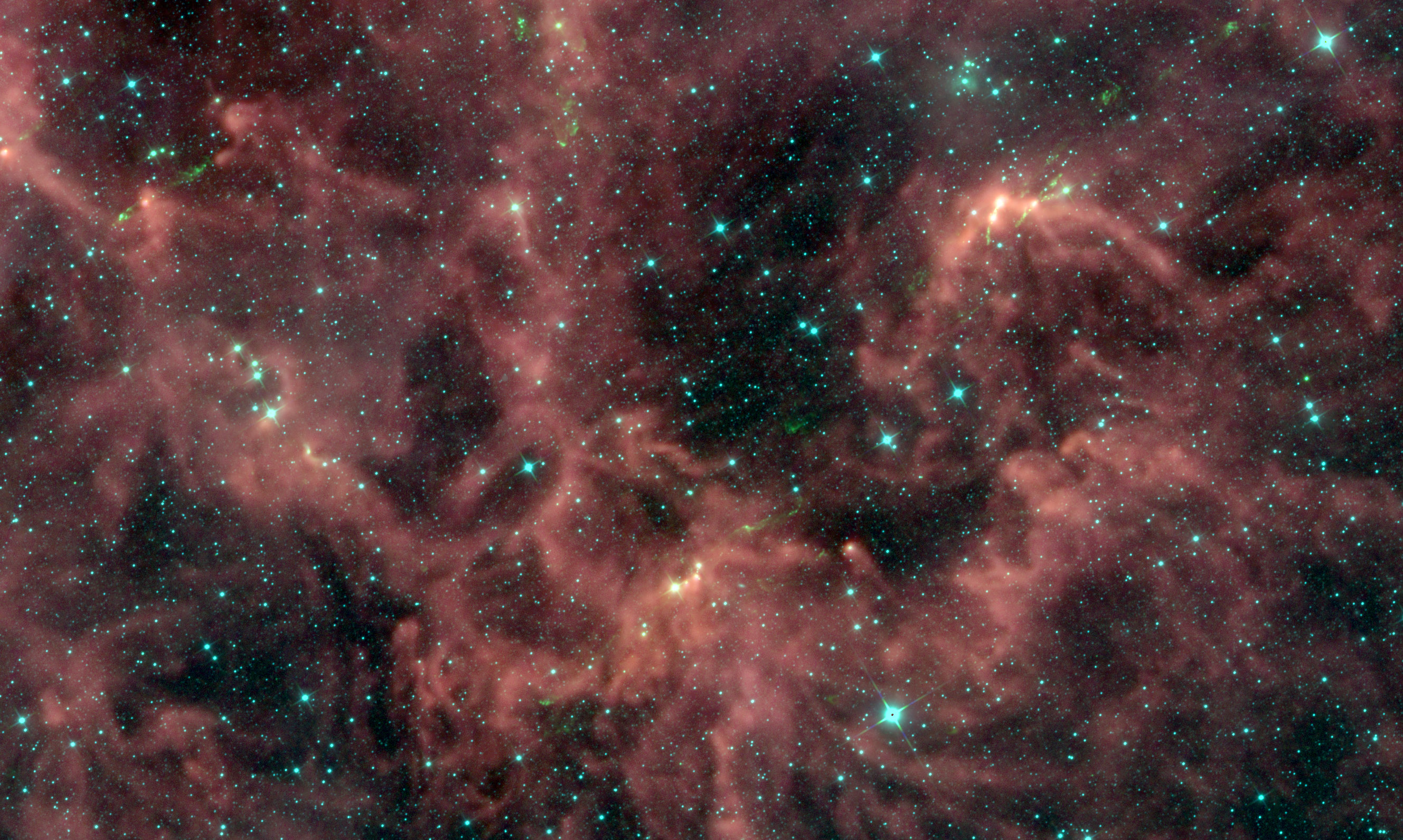
The region south of NGC 1333 in infrared. It shows the dark clouds Barnard 203 and 204

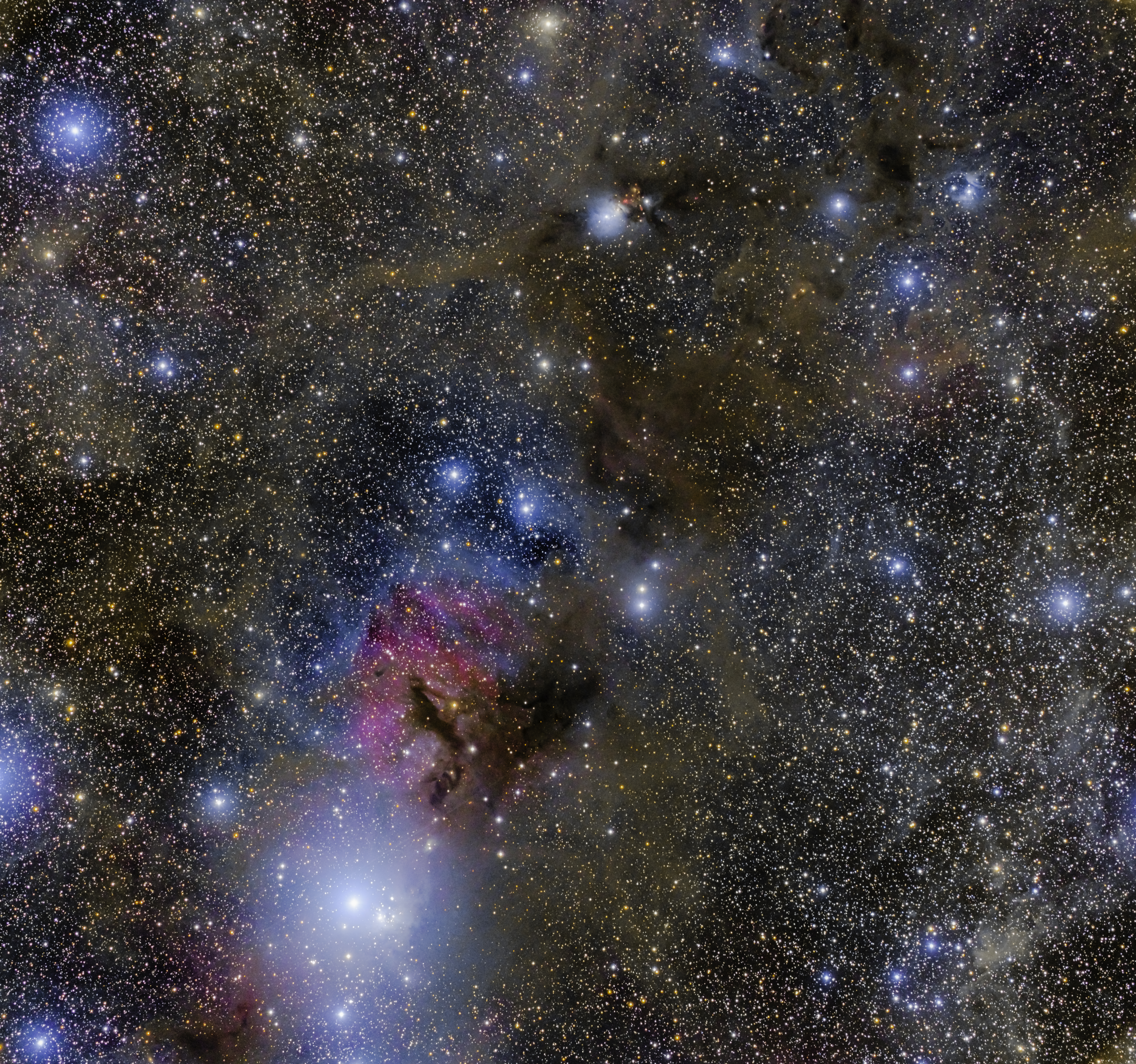
Perseus giant molecular cloud with star nurseries IC348 and NGC1333

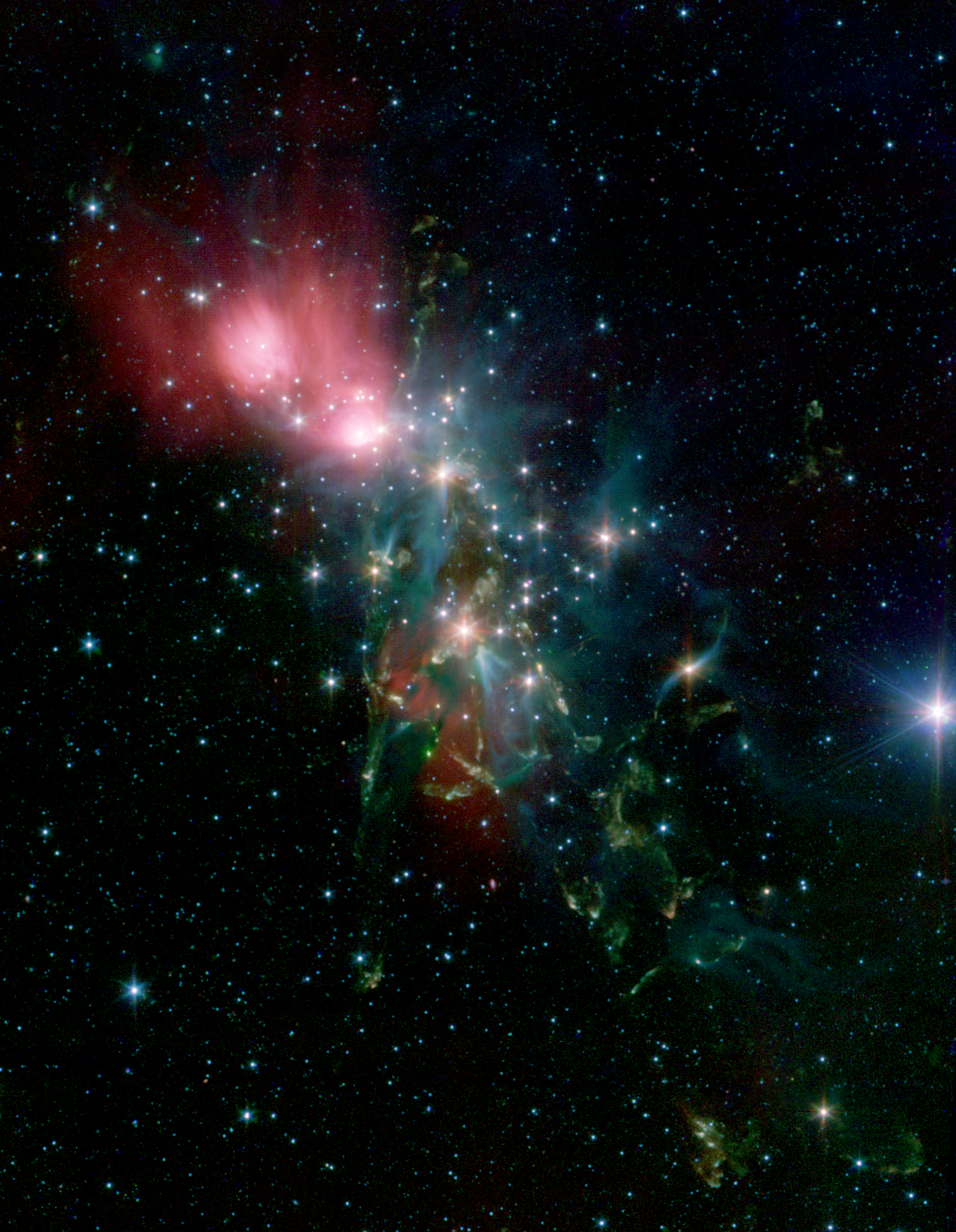
An infrared image of NGC 1333 by the Spitzer Space Telescope

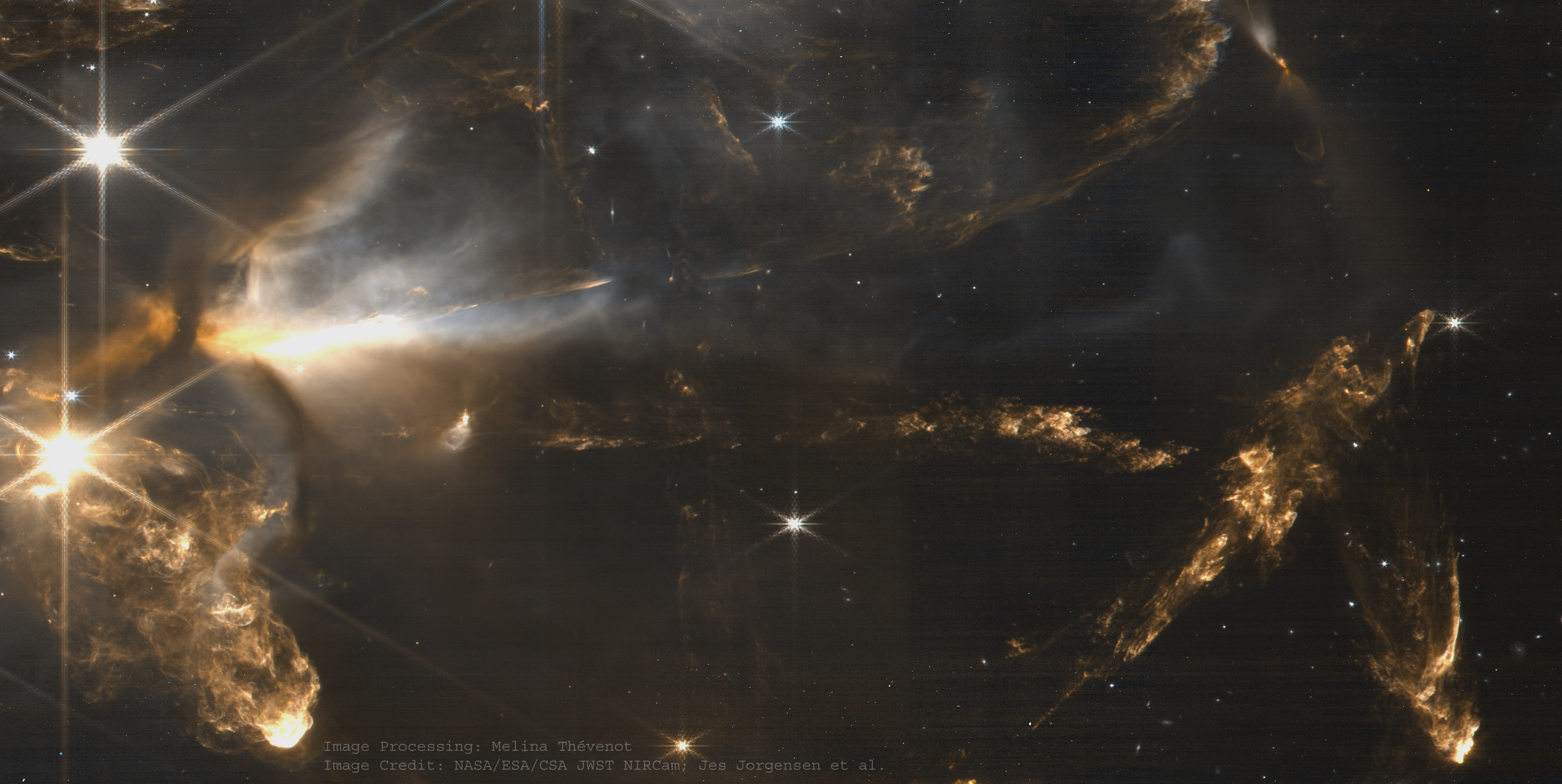
Southern part of NGC 1333 with JWST NIRCam, including HH 7-11 (lower left) originating from V512 Persei (star lower-left).
