= Perseus molecular cloud =

Region in the constellation of Perseus

Perseus Molecular Cloud
Molecular cloud
- Giant molecular cloud
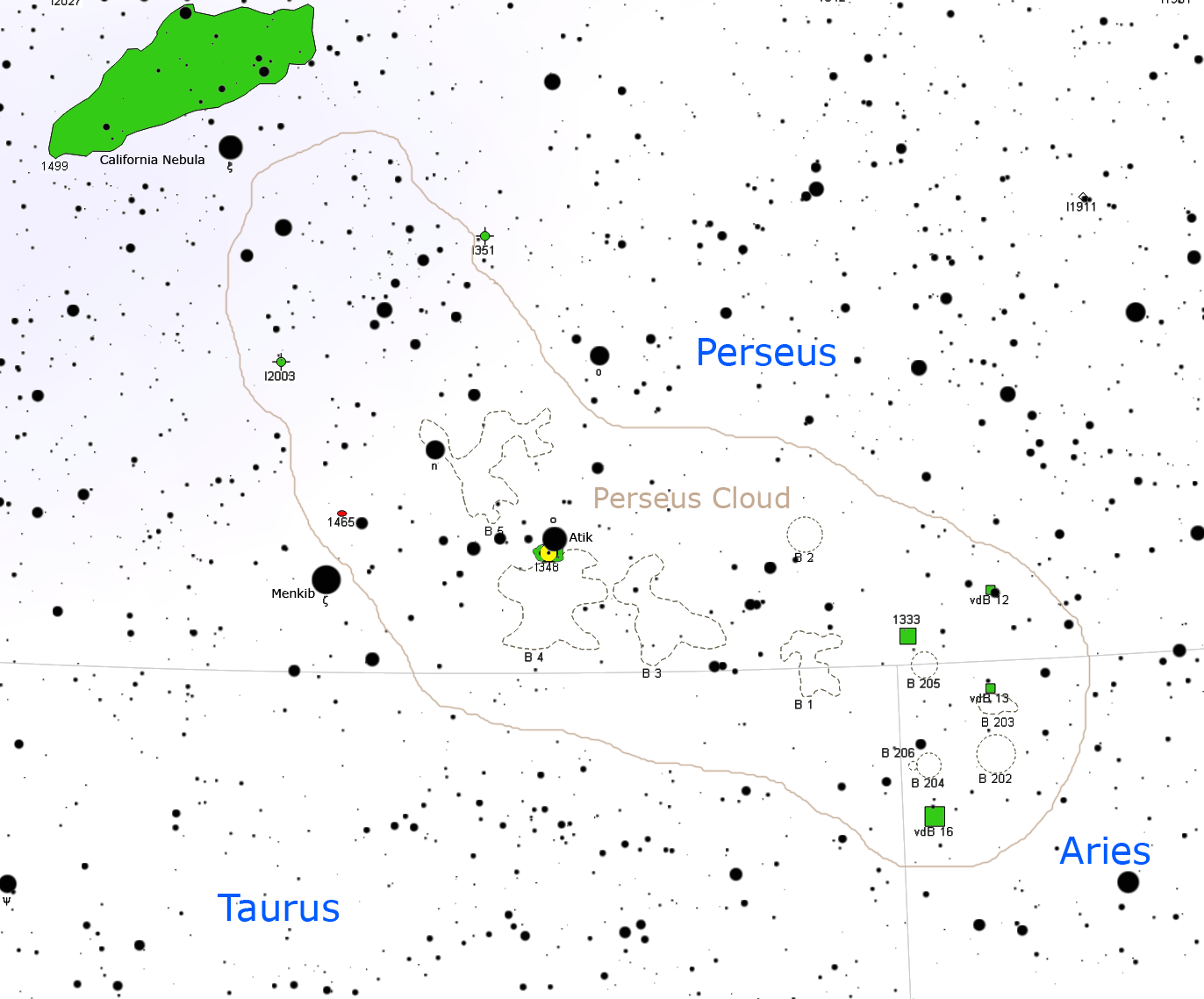
- Map of the Perseus molecular cloud

Observation data: J2000.0 epoch
- Right ascension: 03^{h} 35.0^{m}
- Declination: +31° 13′
- Distance: 956–1047 ly (293–321 pc)
- Apparent dimensions (V): 6°×2°
- Constellation: Perseus
- Designations: Perseus Molecular Cloud, Perseus Cloud, Per MCld, Per Mol Cloud, Perseus Complex, PMC

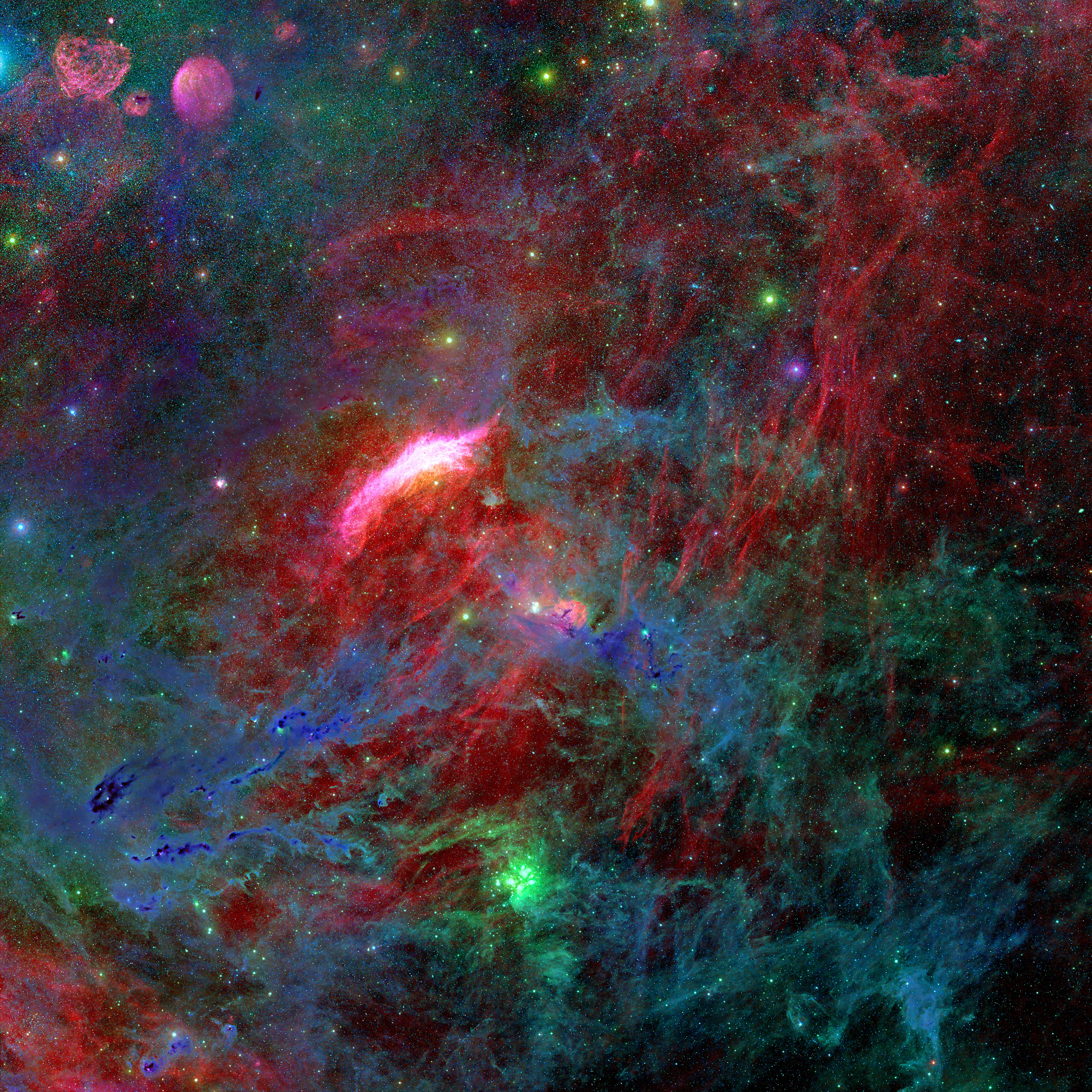
Perseus molecular cloud (green and blue) in front of HII regions (red), seen by the Northern Sky Narrowband Survey.

The Perseus molecular cloud (Per MCld) is a nearby (~1000 ly) giant molecular cloud in the constellation of Perseus and contains over 10,000 solar masses of gas and dust covering an area of 6 by 2 degrees. Unlike the Orion molecular cloud it is almost invisible apart from two clusters, IC 348 and NGC 1333, where low-mass stars are formed. It is very bright at mid and far-infrared wavelengths and in the submillimeter originating in dust heated by the newly formed low-mass stars.

It shows a curious ring structure in maps made by the IRAS and MSX satellites and the Spitzer Space Telescope and has been detected by the COSMOSOMAS at microwave frequencies as a source of anomalous "spinning dust" emission.

Perseus Molecular Cloud

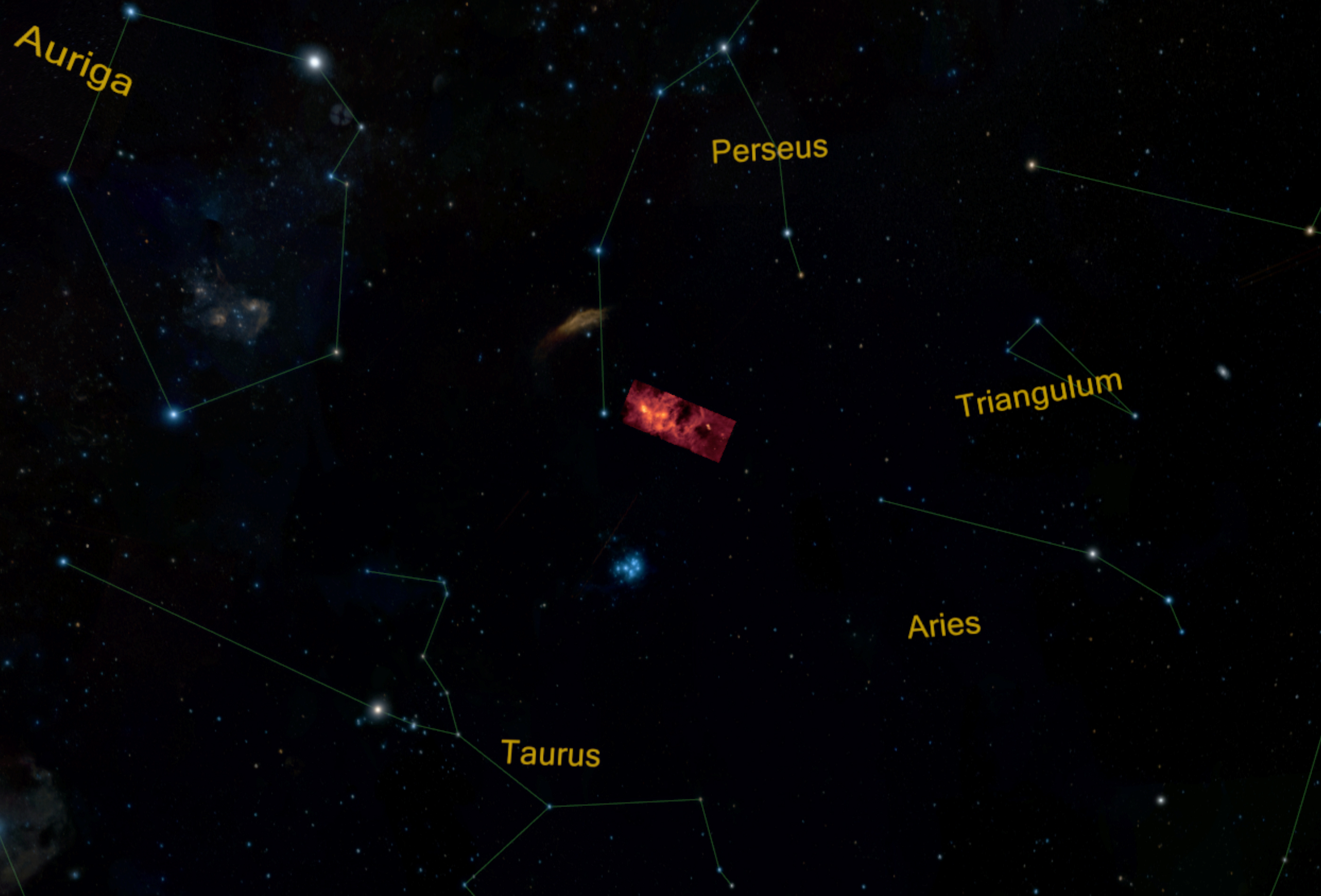
Location

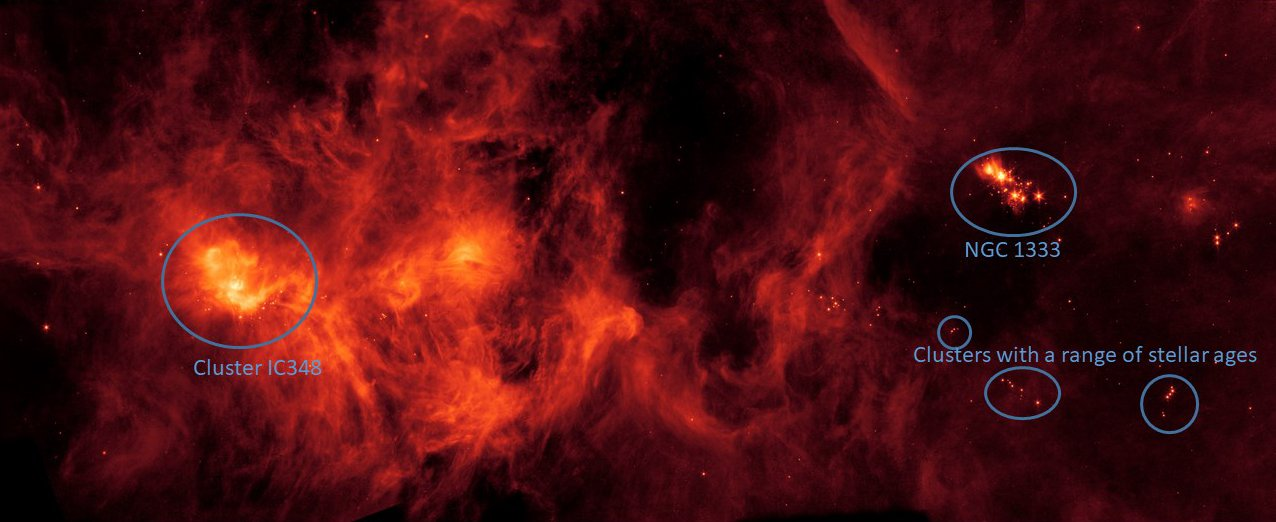
Annotated

Full resolution

Spitzer Space Telescope (19 December 2019)

== See also ==
- Giant molecular cloud
- Orion molecular cloud
- IC 348
- NGC 1333
- Molecular cloud
- Spitzer Space Telescope
- Spinning dust
