= V520 Persei =

Star in the constellation Perseus

- V520 Per is in the cluster NGC 869, labelled as χ.

Observation data Epoch J2000 Equinox ICRS
- Constellation: Perseus
- Right ascension: 02^{h} 19^{m} 04.45252^{s}
- Declination: +57° 08′ 07.7951″
- Apparent magnitude (V): 6.52 - 6.67

Characteristics
- Spectral type: B3 Ia
- U−B color index: −0.346
- B−V color index: +0.452
- Variable type: IA

Astrometry
Radial velocity (R_{v})	−43.40 km/s
Proper motion (μ)	RA: −0.673 mas/yr Dec.: −1.098 mas/yr
Parallax (π)	0.4348±0.0198 mas
Distance	7,500 ± 300 ly (2,300 ± 100 pc)
Absolute magnitude (M_{V})	−7.1

Details
Mass	29.5 M_{☉}
Radius	40.8 R_{☉}
Luminosity	190,000 L_{☉}
Surface gravity (log g)	2.69 cgs
Temperature	21,300 K
Rotation	66
Age	14 Myr

Other designations
- V520 Per, HD 14134, HIP 10805, BD+56°522, SAO 23178, PPM 27425, WDS J02191+5708, 2MASS J02190444+5708078

Database references
SIMBAD	data

V520 Persei is a blue supergiant member of NGC 869, one of the Perseus Double Cluster open clusters. It is an irregular variable star. At a magnitude of about 6.6, V520 Persei is the brightest member in either NGC 869 or NGC 884, although the brighter HD 13994 lies in the foreground along the same line of sight.

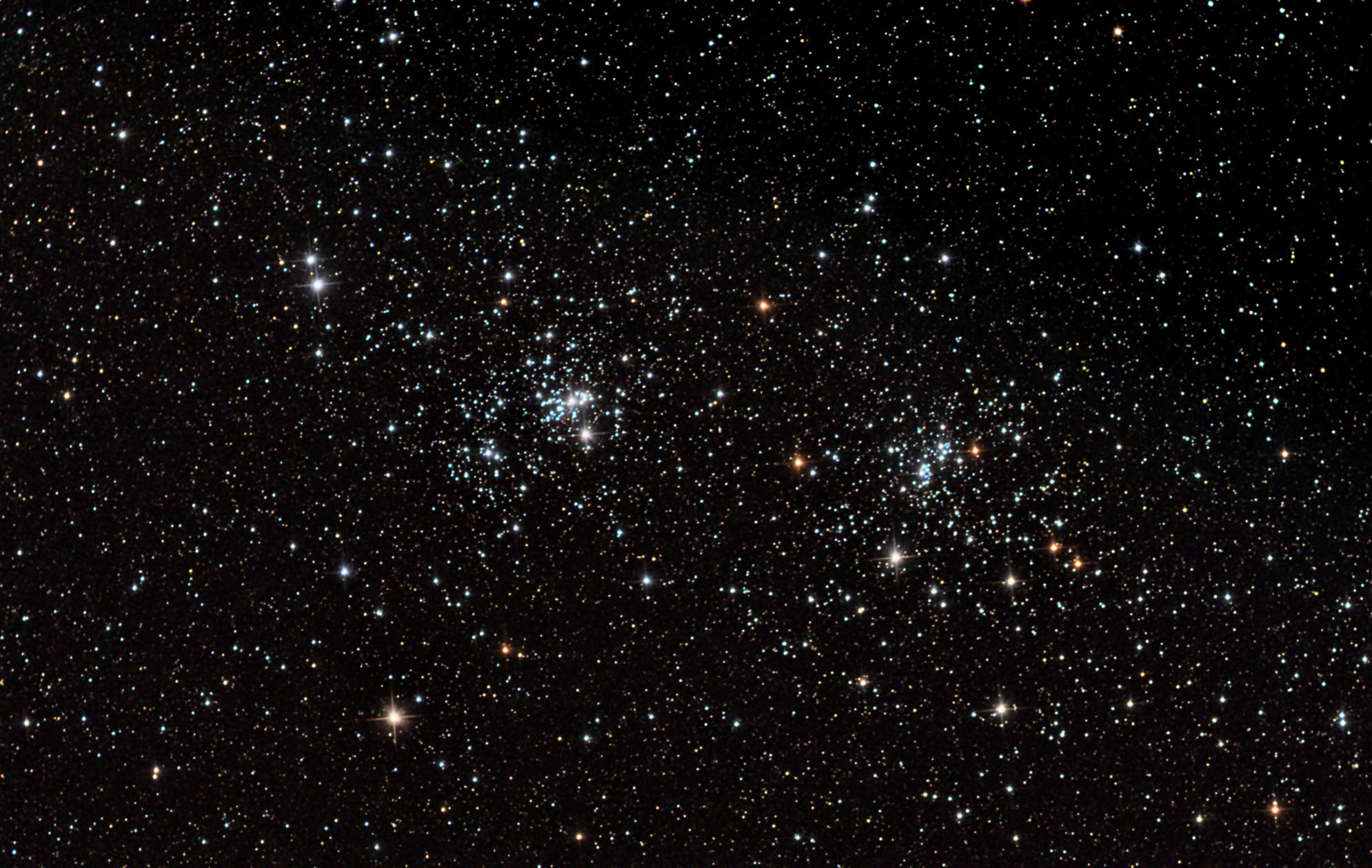
V520 Per is the brightest star at the very centre of NGC 869, the left of the two clusters (north is down).

The Washington Double Star Catalog lists V520 Per as a double star about 15" from a 13th magnitude A0 companion which is another cluster member. There are dozens of other stars within an arc-minute, including several brighter than 10th magnitude and two 15th magnitude stars closer than the listed companion. The Catalogue of Components of Double and Multiple Stars also lists a single companion, but it is an 11th magnitude star 29" away.

V520 Per is a well-defined member of NGC 869 by location, proper motion, photometry, and spectroscopy, which places it at the same distance of around 7,000 light years. This is supported by the Gaia Data Release 3 parallax of 0.43 mas.

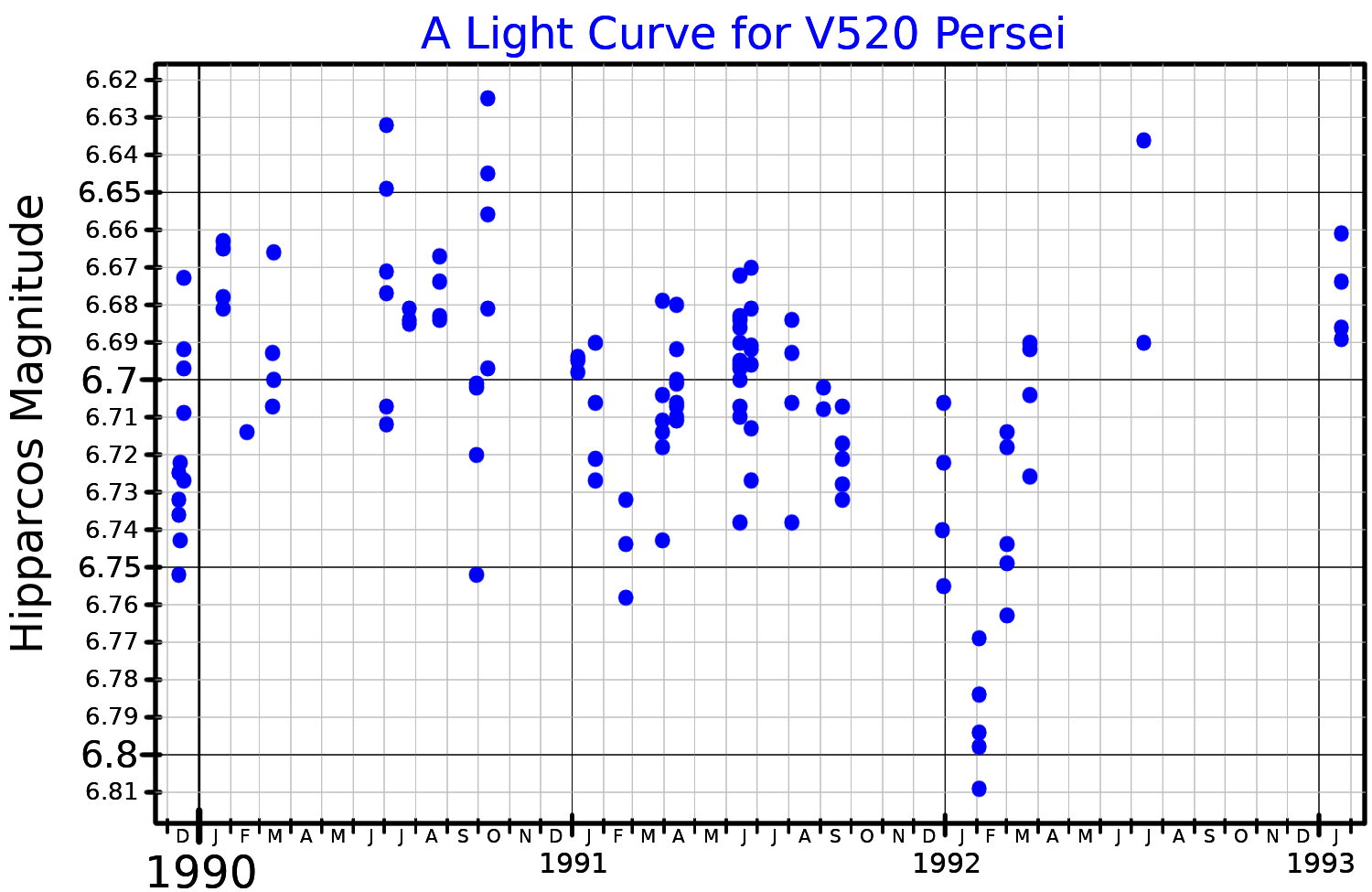
A light curve for V520 Persei, plotted from Hipparcos data

The type of variability is listed in the General Catalogue of Variable Stars as IA, indicating it is poorly studied with no clear period. The visual range is 6.52 - 6.67. Statistical analysis of Hipparcos photometry suggests a possible period of 1.6 days, but the type variability is not clearly defined.

V520 Persei is a supergiant with a spectral class of B3. It also shows some emission lines in its spectrum. It has exhausted its core hydrogen and expanded into a more luminous star fusing hydrogen in a shell or helium in its core. It is over 100,000 times more luminous than the sun, although only thirty times its mass. Much of the luminosity arises from ultraviolet radiation created by the temperature of over 20,000 K.

V520 Per has been identified as one of Flamsteed's "missing stars", catalogue numbers created by Flamsteed but not actually associated with a current star in that constellation. It is described as being 61 Andromedae, although it is well outside the boundary of Andromeda and Flamsteed catalogued other nearby stars in Perseus, for example 7 Persei for χ Per itself.
