= T Persei =

Star in the constellation Perseus

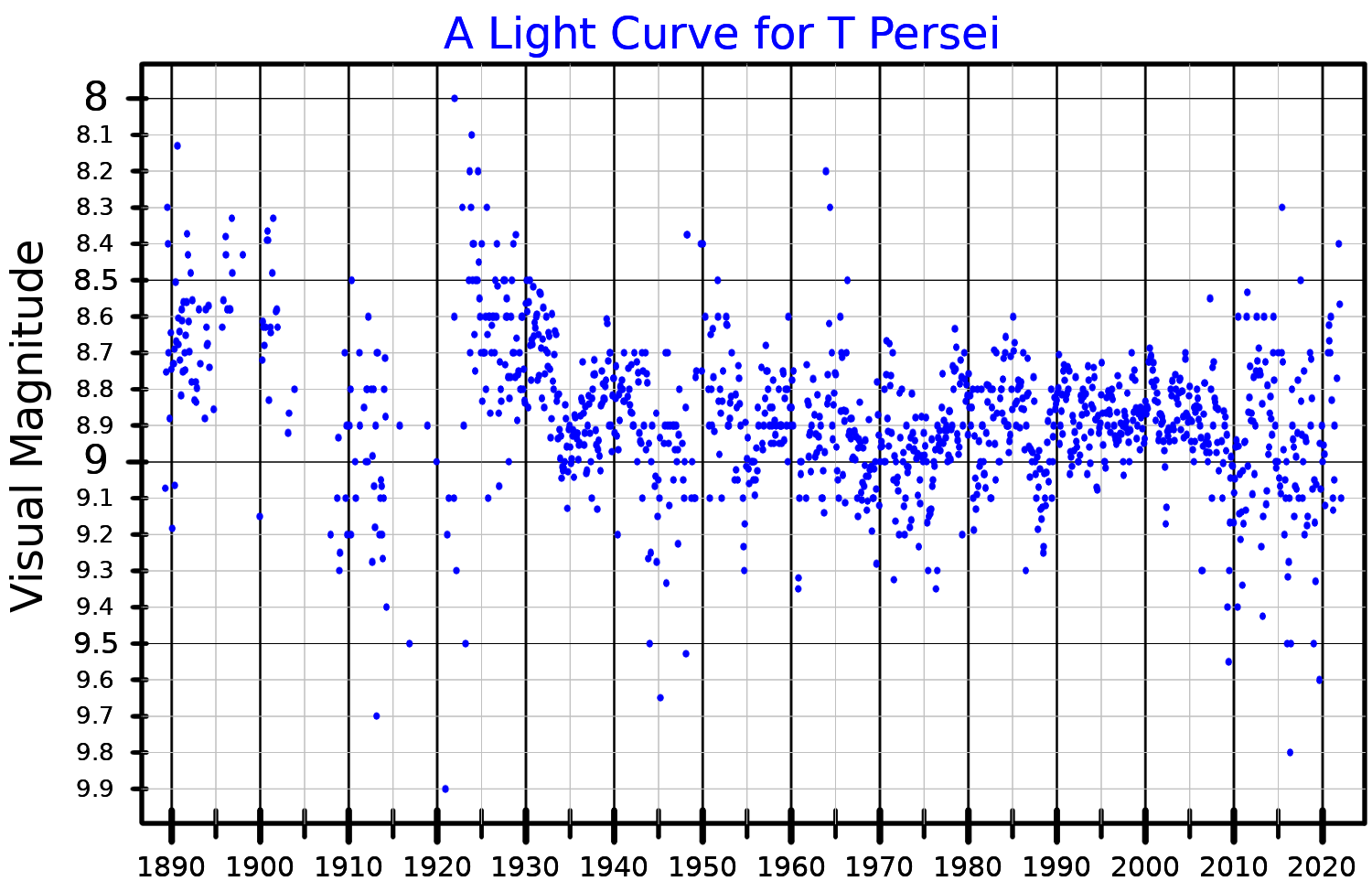
- A visual band light curve For T Persei, plotted from AAVSO data

Observation data Epoch J2000 Equinox ICRS
- Constellation: Perseus
- Right ascension: 02^{h} 19^{m} 21.87717^{s}
- Declination: +58° 57′ 40.3455″
- Apparent magnitude (V): 8.34-9.70

Characteristics
- Spectral type: M2Iab
- U−B color index: +2.62
- B−V color index: +2.33
- Variable type: SRc

Astrometry
| Radial velocity (R_{v}) | −40.85 km/s |
| Proper motion (μ) | RA: −1.237 mas/yr Dec.: −0.186 mas/yr |
| Parallax (π) | 0.4119±0.0237 mas |
| Distance | 2345±55 pc |
| Absolute magnitude (M_{V}) | −6.90±0.07 |

Details
| Mass | 9-12 M_{☉} |
| Radius | 510±20 R_{☉} |
| Luminosity | 45,700+4,400 −4,000 L_{☉} |
| Surface gravity (log g) | 0.06±0.05 cgs |
| Temperature | 3,750±60 K |
| Metallicity [Fe/H] | −0.35 dex |

Other designations
- T Per, HD 14142, HIP 10829, BD+58°439, WDS J02194+5858, 2MASS J02192186+5857403, AAVSO 0212+58

Database references
| SIMBAD | data |

T Persei is a red supergiant located in the constellation Perseus. It varies in brightness between magnitudes 8.3 and 9.7 and is considered to be a member of the Double Cluster.

T Persei is a member of the Perseus OB1 association around the h and χ Persei open clusters, around 2 degrees north of the centre of the clusters. It is generally treated as an outlying member of the clusters. It lies half a degree away from S Persei, another red supergiant Double Cluster member.

Vojtěch Šafařík discovered that the star is a variable star in 1882. It was listed with its variable star designation, T Persei, in Annie Jump Cannon's 1907 work Second Catalog of Variable Stars. T Per is a semiregular variable star, whose brightness varies from magnitude 8.34 to 9.7 over a period of 2,430 days. Unlike many red supergiants, it does not appear to have a long secondary period. It is relatively inactive for the red supergiant star, with low mass loss rate 8×10^{−6} Solar_mass/year and no detectable dust shell.

The Washington Double Star Catalog lists T Persei as having a 9th magnitude companion 0.1 arc-seconds away. This is derived from Hipparcos measurements. However, no other sources report a companion.
