= 10 Persei =

Blue supergiant star in the constellation Perseus

- Location of 10 Per (circled)

Observation data Epoch J2000 Equinox ICRS
- Constellation: Perseus
- Right ascension: 02^{h} 25^{m} 16.02834^{s}
- Declination: +56° 36′ 35.3544″
- Apparent magnitude (V): 6.26

Characteristics
- Evolutionary stage: Blue supergiant
- Spectral type: B2Ia
- U−B color index: −0.61
- B−V color index: +0.30
- Variable type: α Cyg

Astrometry
Radial velocity (R_{v})	−39.87±1.93 km/s
Proper motion (μ)	RA: −0.508 mas/yr Dec.: −1.182 mas/yr
Parallax (π)	0.4424±0.0263 mas
Distance	7000±815 ly (2,150±250 pc)
Absolute magnitude (M_{V})	−6.70

Details
Mass	23.6±1.9 M_{☉}
Radius	49±6 R_{☉}
Luminosity	257,000 L_{☉}
Surface gravity (log g)	2.45±0.07 cgs
Temperature	18,600±300 K
Rotational velocity (v sin i)	48±6 km/s
Age	7.76 Myr

Other designations
- V554 Persei, HR 696, HD 14818, BD+55°612, HIP 11279, SAO 23304, GC 2885

Database references
SIMBAD	data

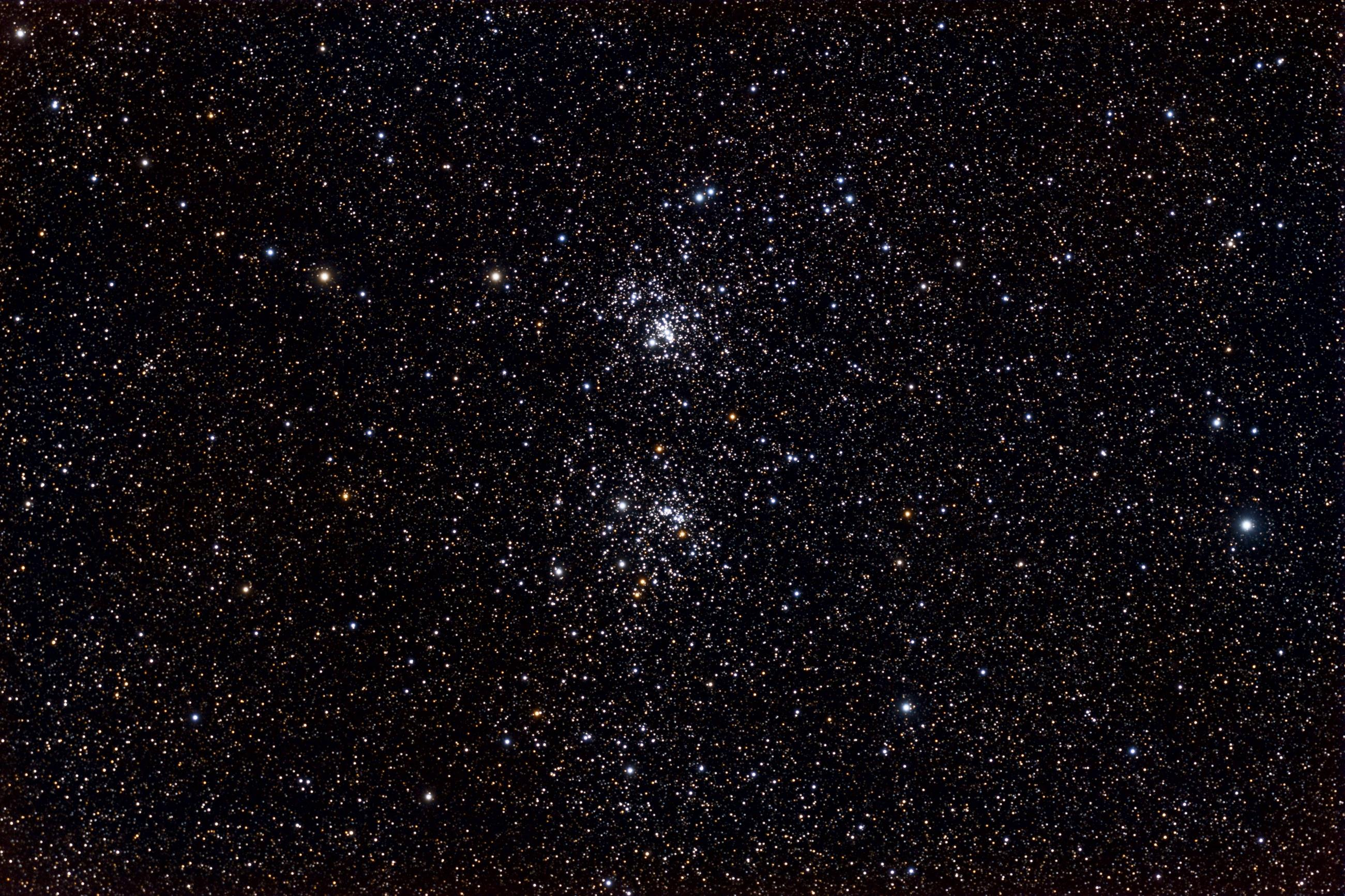
10 Per is the bright star below and right of the Double Cluster

10 Persei is a blue supergiant star in the constellation Perseus. Its apparent magnitude is 6.26 although it is slightly variable.

10 Persei is located around 3,333 parsecs (10,870 ly) distant in the Perseus OB1 stellar association. It lies close to the Double Cluster and is considered a cluster member.

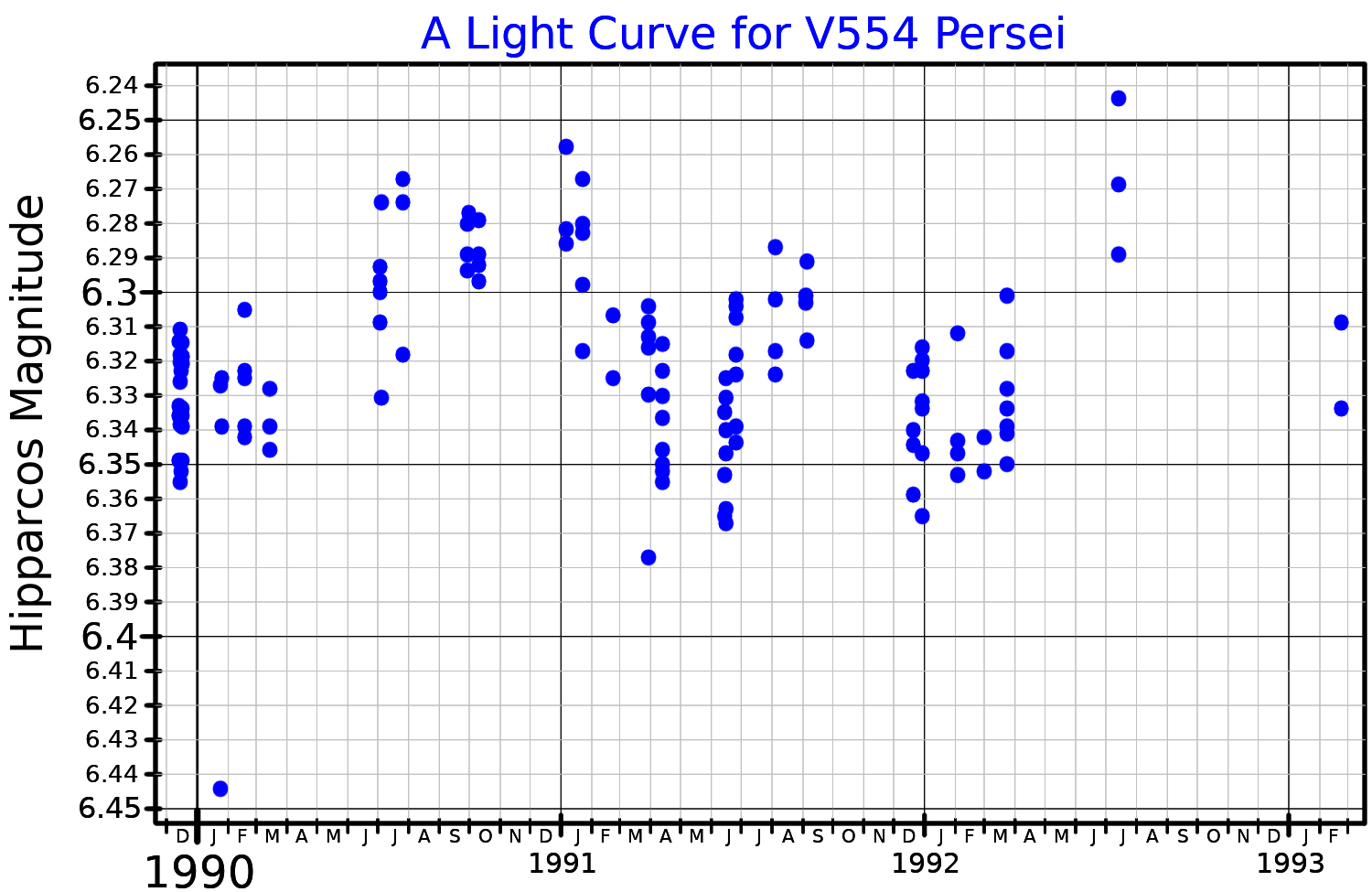
A light curve for V554 Persei, plotted from Hipparcos data

In 1999, 10 Persei was given the variable star designation V554 Persei, after being identified as varying in Hipparcos photometry. Its brightness varies by less than a tenth of a magnitude with no clear period.
