= 5 Persei =

Star in the constellation Perseus

- Location of 5 Persei (circled)

Observation data Epoch J2000.0 Equinox J2000.0
- Constellation: Perseus
- Right ascension: 02^{h} 11^{m} 29.19322^{s}
- Declination: +57° 38′ 43.9634″
- Apparent magnitude (V): +6.35

Characteristics
- Spectral type: B5 Ia
- U−B color index: −0.45
- B−V color index: +0.33
- Variable type: suspected

Astrometry
Radial velocity (R_{v})	−34.1±0.9 km/s
Proper motion (μ)	RA: −0.540 mas/yr Dec.: −0.675 mas/yr
Parallax (π)	0.4174±0.0397 mas
Distance	2950+388 −340 pc
Absolute magnitude (M_{V})	−6.7

Details
Radius	79.93+5.89 −5.38 R_{☉}
Luminosity	83,000 L_{☉}
Surface gravity (log g)	2.00 cgs
Temperature	15,000 K
Rotational velocity (v sin i)	30 km/s

Other designations
- 5 Per, NSV 15451, BD+56°438, FK5 1054, HD 13267, HIP 10227, HR 627, SAO 23011, WDS J02115+5739

Database references
SIMBAD	data

5 Persei is a star in the northern constellation of Perseus located around 2,950 parsecs (9,600 ly) away from the Sun. It is part of the Perseus OB1 stellar association and lies near the Double Cluster. This object is near the lower limit of visibility to the naked eye with an apparent visual magnitude of +6.35. It is moving closer to the Earth with a heliocentric radial velocity of −34 km/s.

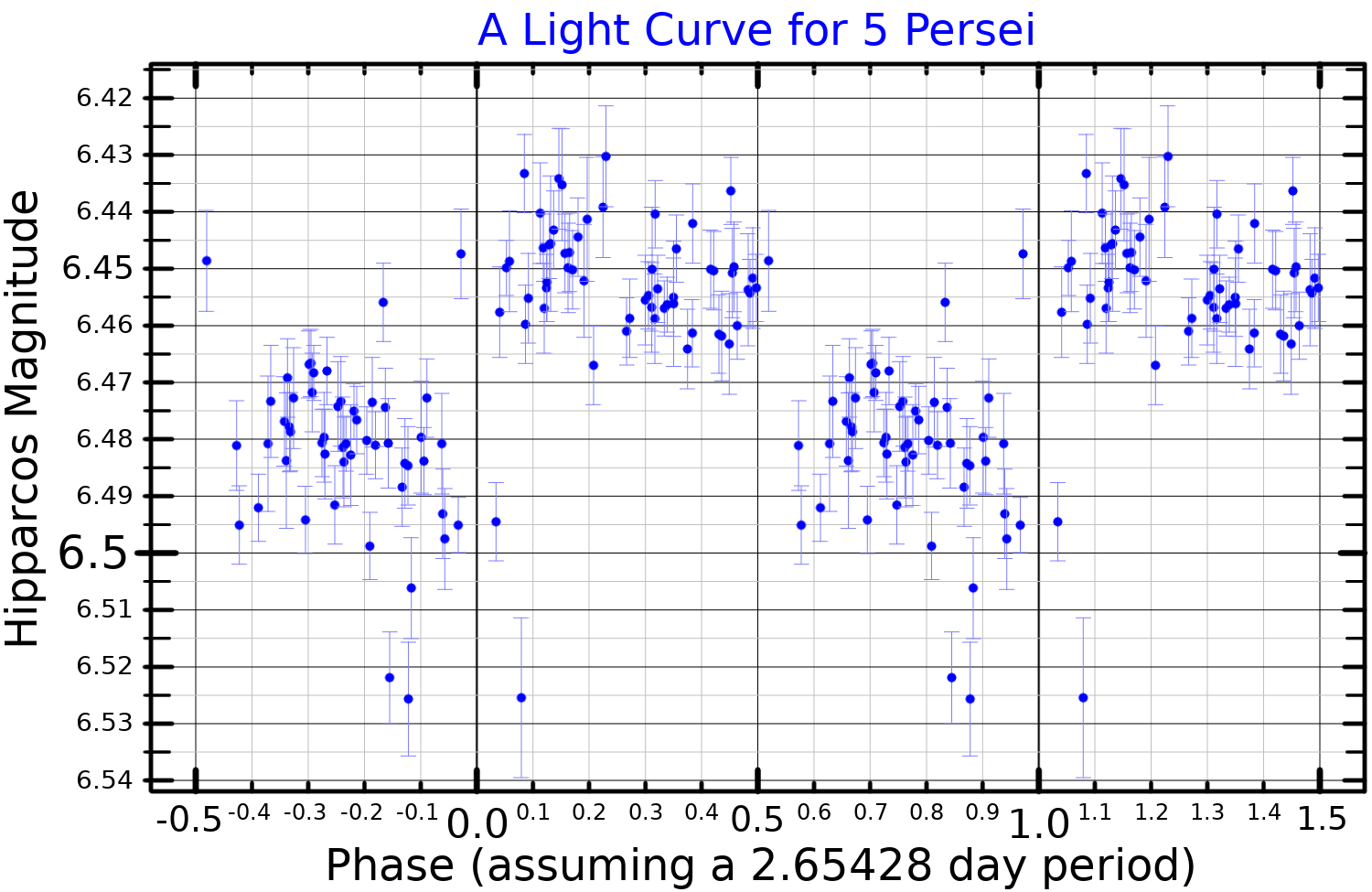
A light curve for 5 Persei, plotted from Hipparcos data

This is a blue supergiant of spectral type B5 Ia; a massive star that has used up its core hydrogen and expanded into a very luminous star. It has an effective temperature around 15,000 K and is radiating 83,000 times the Sun's luminosity. Several studies of 5 Persei have detected possible small amplitude variations. In 1983, an amplitude of 0.045 magnitudes was measured with a possible period of eight days. An analysis of Hipparcos photometry showed an amplitude of 0.0168 magnitudes and a period of 2.65 days. The statistical signal was strong enough for the variability to be very likely, but 5 Persei has not formally been catalogued as a variable star.

5 Persei has two nearby companions, a 12th magnitude star 5.7 arc-seconds away and a 13th magnitude star one arc-minute away.
