= S Persei =

Star in the constellation Perseus

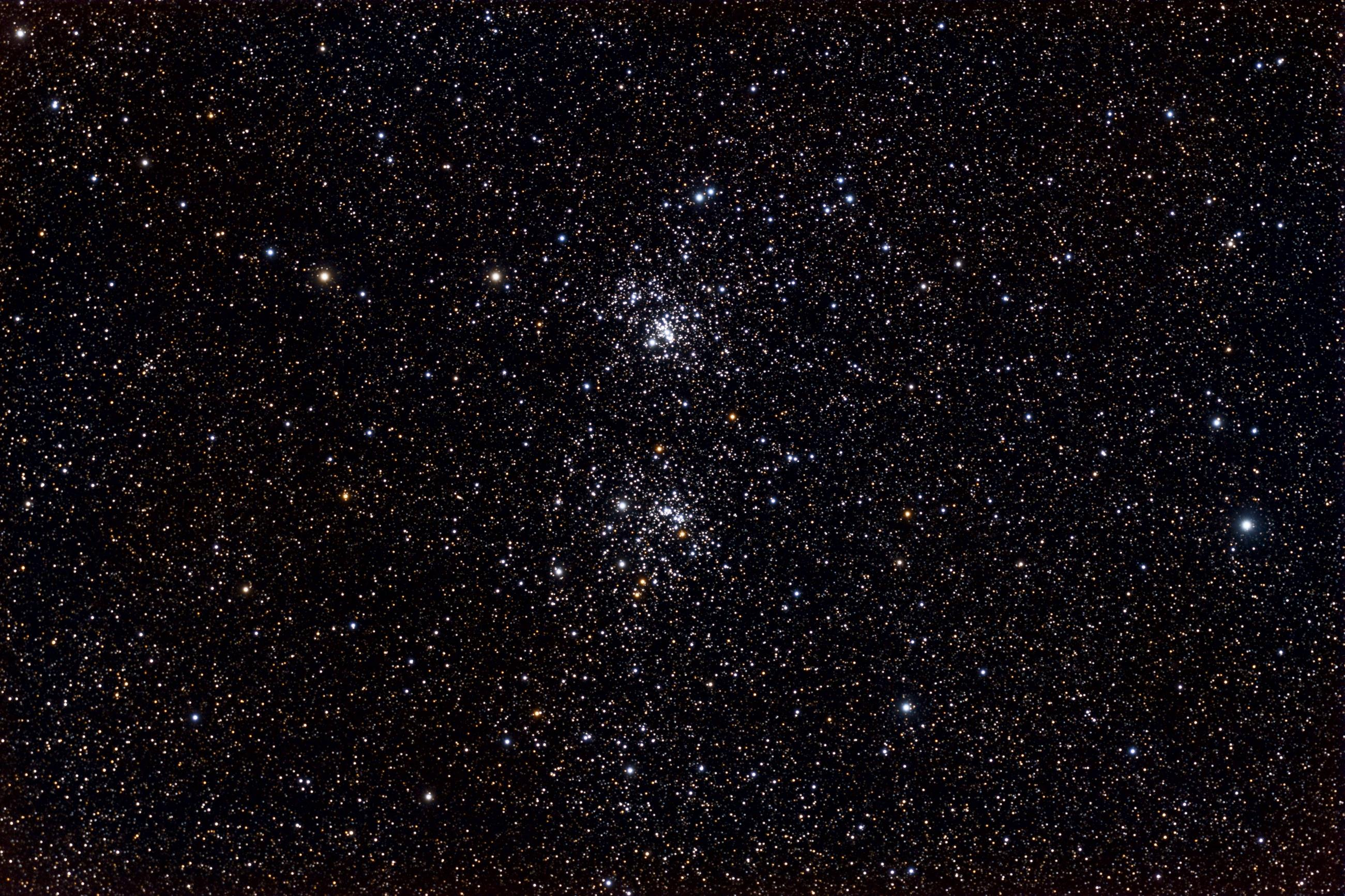
- Location of S Persei (circled) near the Double Cluster (north is left)

Observation data Epoch J2000 Equinox ICRS
- Constellation: Perseus
- Right ascension: 02^{h} 22^{m} 51.70928^{s}
- Declination: +58° 31′ 11.4476″
- Apparent magnitude (V): 7.9 - 12.0

Characteristics
- Spectral type: M3 Iae–M7
- B−V color index: +2.65
- Variable type: SRc

Astrometry
Radial velocity (R_{v})	-39.71 km/s
Proper motion (μ)	RA: –0.49 ± 0.23 mas/yr Dec.: −1.19 ± 0.20 mas/yr
Parallax (π)	0.413±0.017 mas
Distance	7,900 ± 300 ly (2,420 ± 100 pc)
Absolute magnitude (M_{V})	–6.36 (at m_{V} 9.23)

Details
Mass	20 M_{☉}
Radius	1,298+64 −57 – 1,364±6 R_{☉}
Luminosity	123,000 – 186,000 L_{☉}
Surface gravity (log g)	0.0 cgs
Temperature	3,000 – 3,600 K

Other designations
- S Per, AAVSO 0215+58, BD+57°552, HD 14528, HIP 11093, SAO 23261, WDS J02229+5835

Database references
SIMBAD	data

S Persei is a red supergiant or hypergiant located near the Double Cluster in Perseus, north of the open cluster NGC 869. It is a member of the Perseus OB1 association and is one of the largest known stars. If placed in the Solar System, its photosphere would engulf the orbit of Jupiter. It is also a semiregular variable, a star whose variations are less regular than those of Mira variables.

== Discovery ==
S Persei was named by German astronomer Adalbert Krueger in 1874 after observing that it varied in brightness. It was subsequently listed in major stellar catalogues of that era as HD 14528 and BD+57°552.

== Variability ==
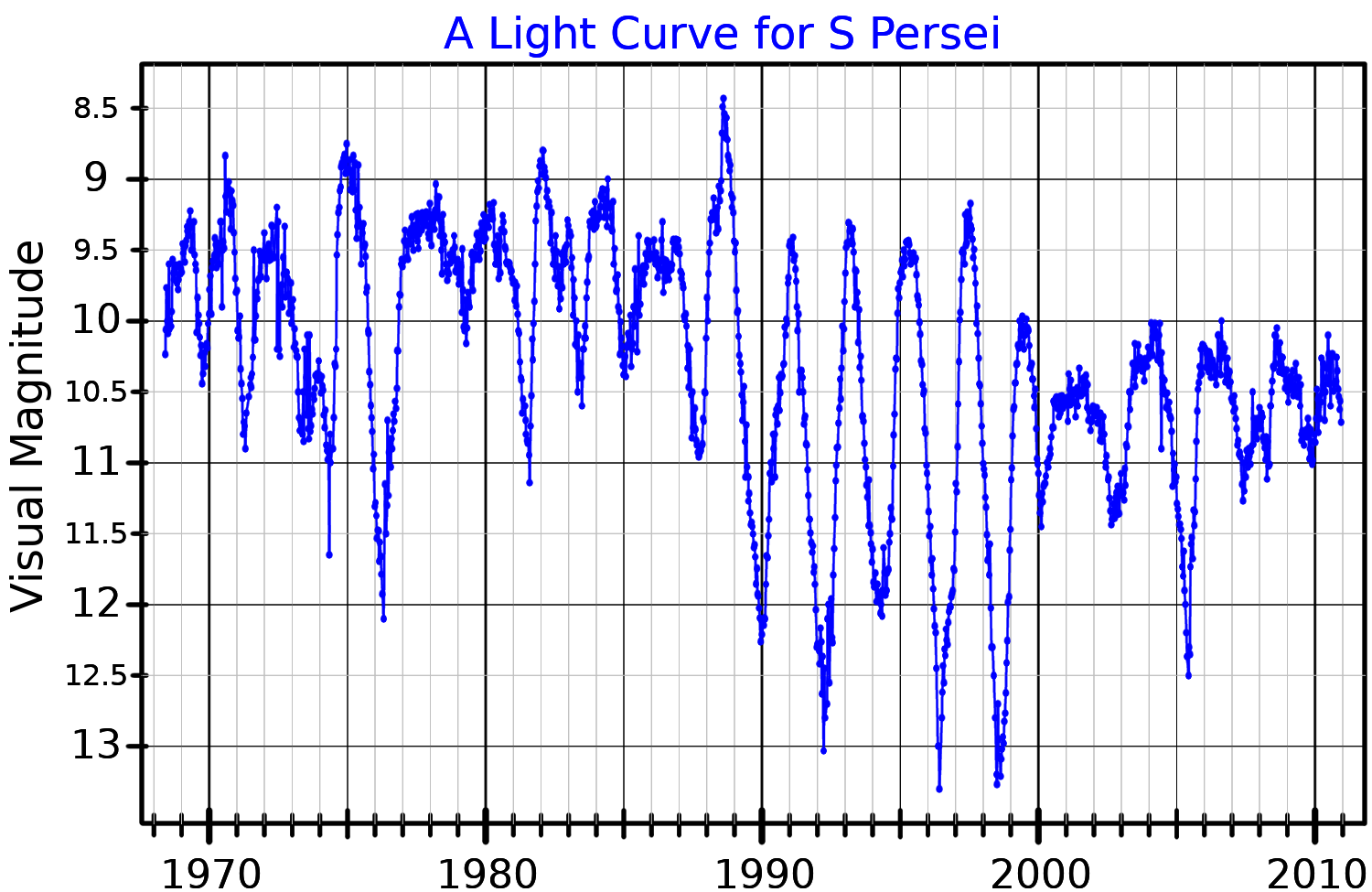
A visual band light curve for S Persei, plotted from AAVSO data

S Persei varies slowly by several magnitudes, a factor of over 40 in brightness. It has a main period of somewhat over two years, but shows significant unpredictability. There is a strong variation in the amplitude from around one magnitude to about four magnitudes, and these have been interpreted as beats due to a second period of about 940 days. Other analyses find only the primary period of 813 ± 60 days.

S Persei is classified as a semiregular variable star of type SRc, indicating that it is a supergiant, and it has one of the largest visual amplitudes of any variable of this type. While the General Catalogue of Variable Stars lists it as varying between magnitudes 7.9 and 12.0, it has since been seen fainter.

The spectral type of S Persei also varies. Typically it is a red supergiant of spectral class M3 or M4, but particularly at deep visual minima it may show a much cooler spectral type of M7 or M8, highly unusual for a supergiant.

== Properties ==
Many of the visually bright variable stars belong to this class of semiregulars, as these stars are extremely large and luminous, and hence visible across long distances. S Persei has been described as a hypergiant and has a radius over 700 times the sun's radius (R_{☉}). Its angular diameter has been measured directly and found to be somewhat elliptical. Modelled as a uniform disk, the radius corresponds to 1,212 ± 124 R_{☉}.

The temperature has been calculated from the spectrum using a DUSTY model, giving an effective photospheric temperature of 3,500 K and a temperature of 1,000 K for the surrounding dust torus. This is consistent with previous studies, but the derived luminosity from different authors varies from 86,000 L_{☉} to 186,000 L_{☉}. Older studies frequently calculated higher luminosities, lower temperatures, and consequently larger values for the radius.

The mass of S Persei is also uncertain, but expected to be around 20 M_{☉}. Mass is being lost at 2.4 to 2.6×10^{−5} M_{☉} per year, leading to an extensive and complex circumstellar environment of gas and dust.

== Location ==
S Persei is surrounded by clouds containing water molecules which produce maser emission. This allows the distance to be measured very accurately using very long baseline interferometry, giving an annual parallax of 0.413 ± 0.017 milliarcseconds. For comparison, the Gaia Data Release 2 parallax is 0.2217±0.1214 mas. It lies somewhat further away than the centres of the Double Cluster open clusters, but definitely within the Per OB1 association and the Perseus Arm of the galaxy.

S Persei is a double star. The red supergiant has an A0 11th magnitude companion at 69". There are also several other 8th to 10th magnitude stars within half a degree of S Persei.

== See also ==
- VX Sagittarii – A comparable late-type red supergiant or hypergiant with both strong spectral variability and one of the largest visual amplitudes

Similar red supergiants or hypergiants with strong spectral variability

- BC Cygni
- HV 11423
- KW Sagittarii
- Westerlund 1 W26

Similar red supergiants or hypergiants with a large visual amplitude

- AH Scorpii
- VY Canis Majoris

Other comparable red supergiants or hypergiants

- PZ Cassiopeiae
- UY Scuti
