= RS Persei =

Star in the constellation Perseus

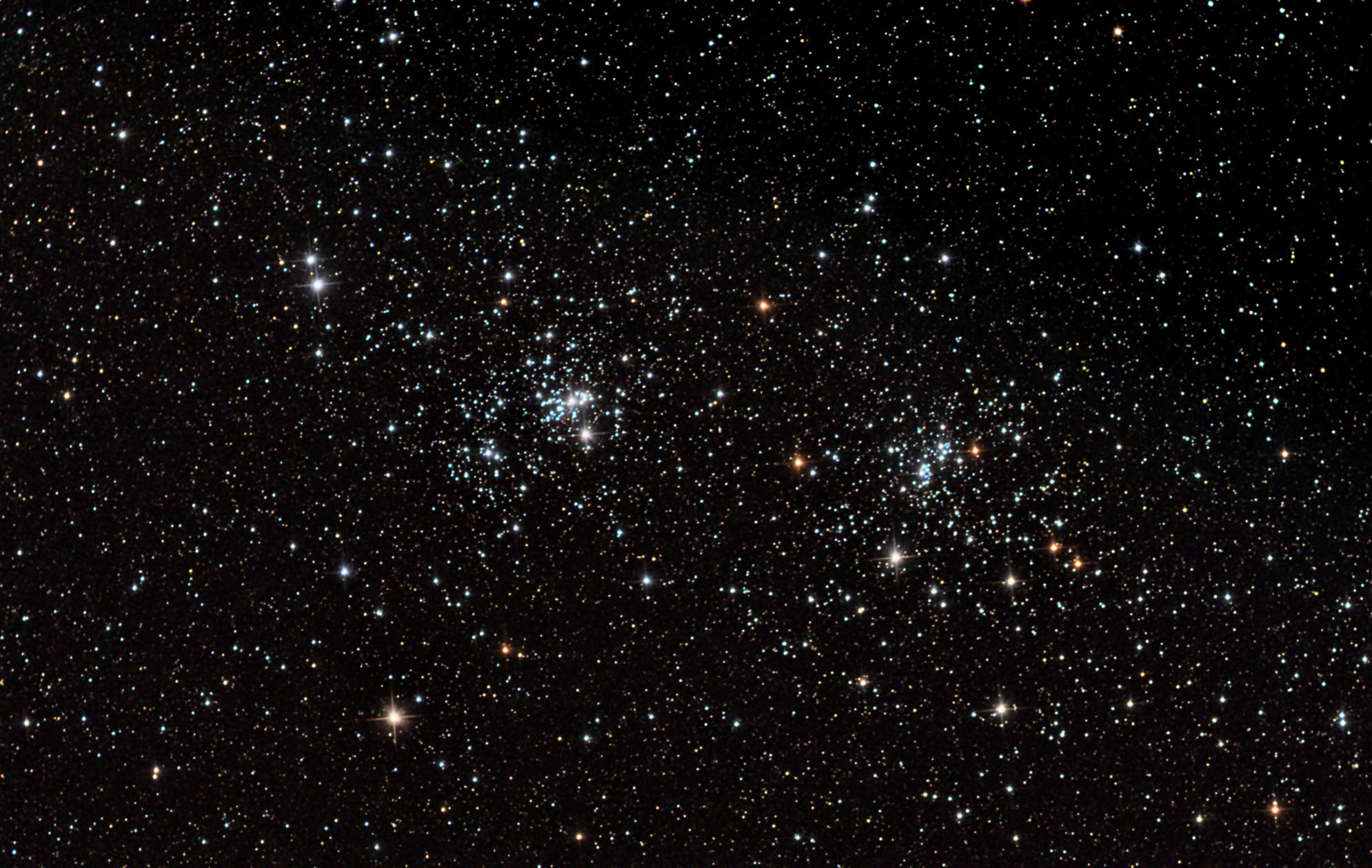
- RS Persei is the red star closest to the centre of NGC 884, the right hand cluster (north is down).

Observation data Epoch J2000 Equinox ICRS
- Constellation: Perseus
- Right ascension: 02^{h} 22^{m} 24.296^{s}
- Declination: +57° 06′ 34.10″
- Apparent magnitude (V): 7.82 – 10.0

Characteristics
- Evolutionary stage: Red supergiant
- Spectral type: M4Iab
- Variable type: SRc

Astrometry
| Radial velocity (R_{v}) | −38.0±2 km/s |
| Proper motion (μ) | RA: −0.602 mas/yr Dec.: −1.107 mas/yr |
| Parallax (π) | 0.3874±0.0450 mas |
| Distance | 7,650±180 ly (2,345±55 pc) |
| Absolute magnitude (M_{V}) | −6.18 |

Details
| Mass | 12 – 15 M_{☉} |
| Radius | 770±30 R_{☉} |
| Luminosity | 77,600+9,500 −8,400 L_{☉} |
| Surface gravity (log g) | −0.2±0.05 cgs |
| Temperature | 3,470±90 K |

Other designations
- RS Per, HD 14488, BD+56°583, 2MASS J02222428+5706340, AAVSO 0215+56A

Database references
| SIMBAD | data |

RS Persei is a red supergiant variable star located in the Double Cluster in Perseus. The star's apparent magnitude varies from 7.82 to 10.0, meaning it is never visible to the naked eye. It is a member of the cluster NGC 884, χ Persei, one half of the famous Double Cluster.

== Variability ==
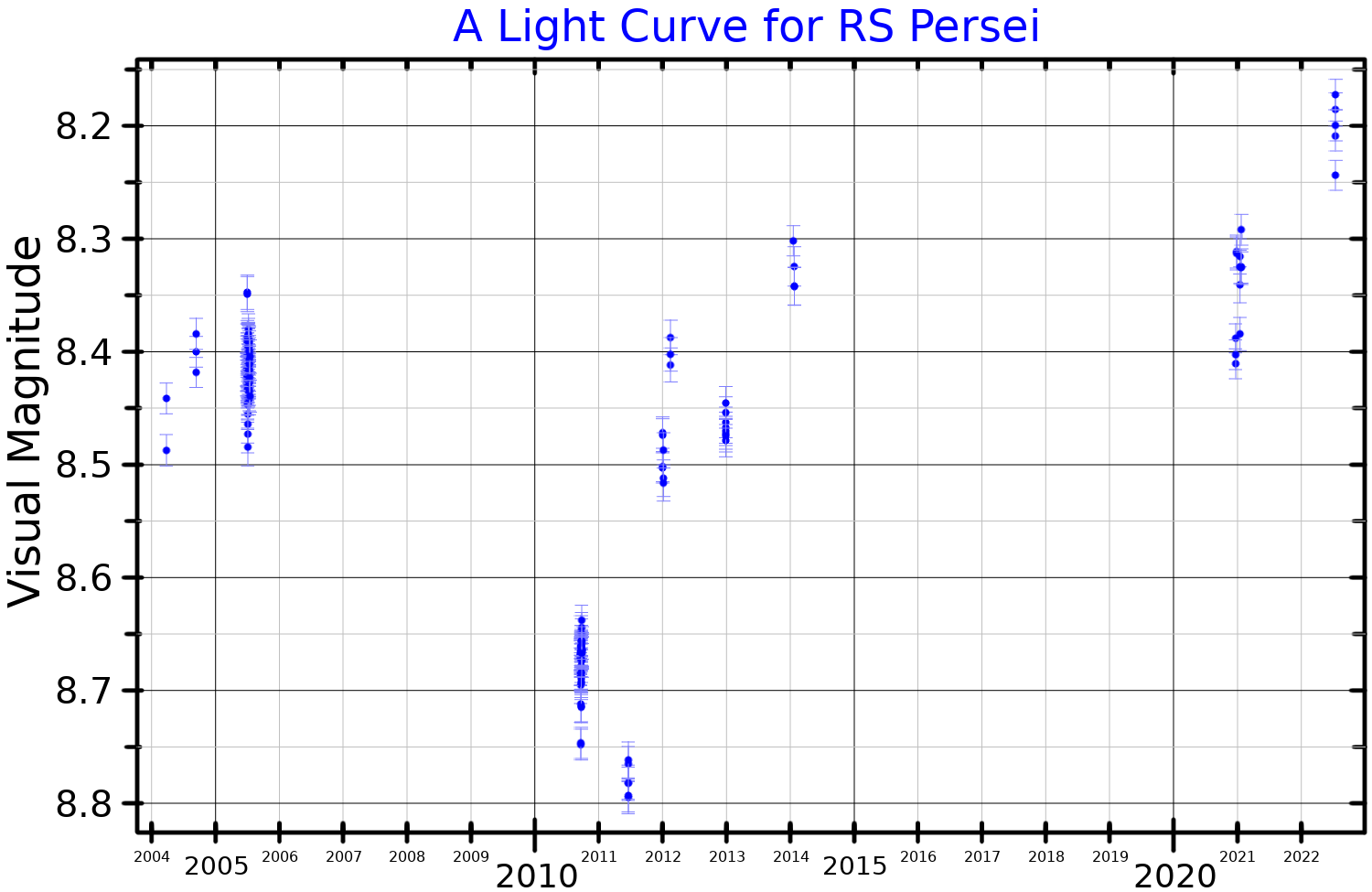
A light curve for RS Persei, plotted from INTEGRAL Optical Monitoring Camera data

In March of 1904, Lidiya Tseraskaya discovered that the star, then referred to as BD+56°583, is a variable star. It was listed with its variable star designation, RS Persei, in Annie Jump Cannon's 1907 work Second Catalog of Variable Stars. RS Persei is classified as a semiregular variable star, with its brightness varying from magnitude 7.82 to 10.0 over 245 days, Detailed studies show that it also pulsates with a long secondary period of 4,200±1,500 days.

== Properties ==
RS Persei is a large cool star with a temperature of 3,500 K. Its size makes it luminous, although much of its radiation is emitted in the infrared. In 2005, RS Per was calculated to have a bolometric luminosity of 145,000 L_{☉} and a radius around 1,000 R_{☉}. More recently, across all wavelengths gives the star a lower luminosity of 77,600+9,500
−8,400 L_{☉}, and a radius of 770±30 R_{☉} based on the distance and the measured angular diameter by the CHARA array. A 2023 paper gives an even smaller luminosity of 59,000 L_{☉}. Estimates based on measured angular diameters and distances estimated by the Gaia DR2 and Gaia DR3 give radii of 547+9
−7 R_{☉} and 775+110
−85 R_{☉}.

RS Persei has sometimes been considered to be a highly evolved low mass Asymptotic Giant Branch (AGB) star, but calculations of its current mass suggest that it is a true red supergiant. NGC 244 is also too young to host AGB stars.

== See also ==
- List of largest known stars
