= HV 11423 =

Star in the Small Magellanic Cloud in the constellation Tucana

- HV 11423 is visible in the full-size image, just to the left (south is up) of cluster NGC 361 (below centre, between the two bright foreground stars). (Digitized Sky Survey 2)

Observation data Epoch J2000 Equinox ICRS
- Constellation: Tucana
- Right ascension: 01^{h} 00^{m} 55.20^{s}
- Declination: −71° 37′ 52.9″
- Apparent magnitude (V): 11.84 - 12.46

Characteristics
- Evolutionary stage: Red supergiant
- Spectral type: M0 Iab (K0/1 I - M4.5/5 I)
- B−V color index: +1.88 - +1.95
- Variable type: Lc

Astrometry
Radial velocity (R_{v})	108.268 km/s
Parallax (π)	0.0692±0.0336 mas
Distance	200,000 ly
Absolute magnitude (M_{V})	−6.5 - −8.4

Details
Radius	1,060-1,220 (Spectral fit), 960-1,000 (V-K) R_{☉}
Luminosity	350,000-200,000 (Spectral fit), 166,000 (V-K) L_{☉}
Surface gravity (log g)	−0.4-−0.2 cgs
Temperature	4,300-3,500 (Spectral fit), 4,480-3,635 (V-K) K

Other designations
- PMMR 114, LI-SMC 140, 2MASS J01005519-7137529

Database references
SIMBAD	data

HV 11423 (PMMR 114 or 140 LI-SMC) is a red supergiant star in the Small Magellanic Cloud. It is about 200,000 light-years away towards the constellation of Tucana.

== Visibility ==
The spectral type of HV 11423 is variable, from K0-1I in December 2004, to M4I in December 2005, and back to K0-1I by September 2006. Very Large Telescope file spectra show that in December 2001 the star was even cooler (M4-5I). By contrast, in October 1978 and a year later, it appeared as a star of class M0I. The spectral type M4-5 is the latest observed in a supergiant of the Small Magellanic Cloud.

== Characteristics ==
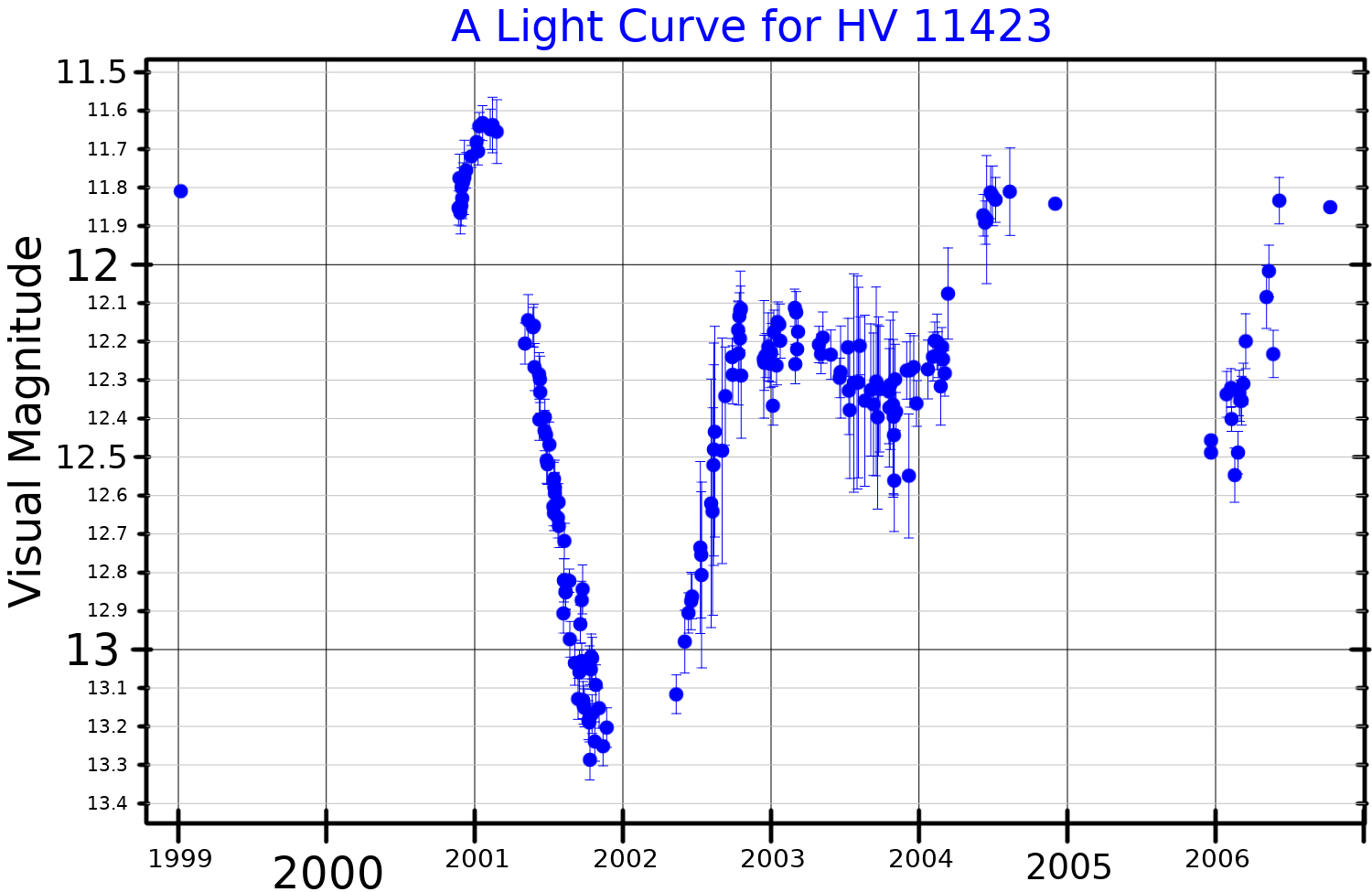
A visual band light curve for HV 11423, adapted from Massey et al. (2007)

HV 11423 is one of the largest known stars with an estimated radius over 1,000 times larger than the sun. It is also a variable star with a variation of up 2 magnitudes at visual wavelengths but essentially constant in the infrared. It is listed in the General Catalogue of Variable Stars as a slow irregular variable, but a period of 720 days has been calculated, as well as a long secondary period of 1,817 days.

The bolometric luminosity is about 200,000 times more than Sun, making it one of the most luminous cool supergiants, and appears to have remained unchanged during the brightness and spectral variations. It is thought that the star is currently undergoing a period of intense instability, in which its effective temperature changes from 4,300 to 3,300 K in a time scale of months; V-band variability may be due primarily to variations in temperature as well as changes in the local extinction due to the creation and dissipation of circumstellar dust. It is speculated that the star may be nearing the end of its life, although the mass loss rate is still moderate at 0.0906 M_{☉} per million years.

== See also ==
Similar red supergiants or hypergiants with strong spectral variability

- BC Cygni
- KW Sagittarii
- S Persei
- VX Sagittarii
- Westerlund 1 W26
