= PR Persei =

Red Supergiant star in the constellation Perseus

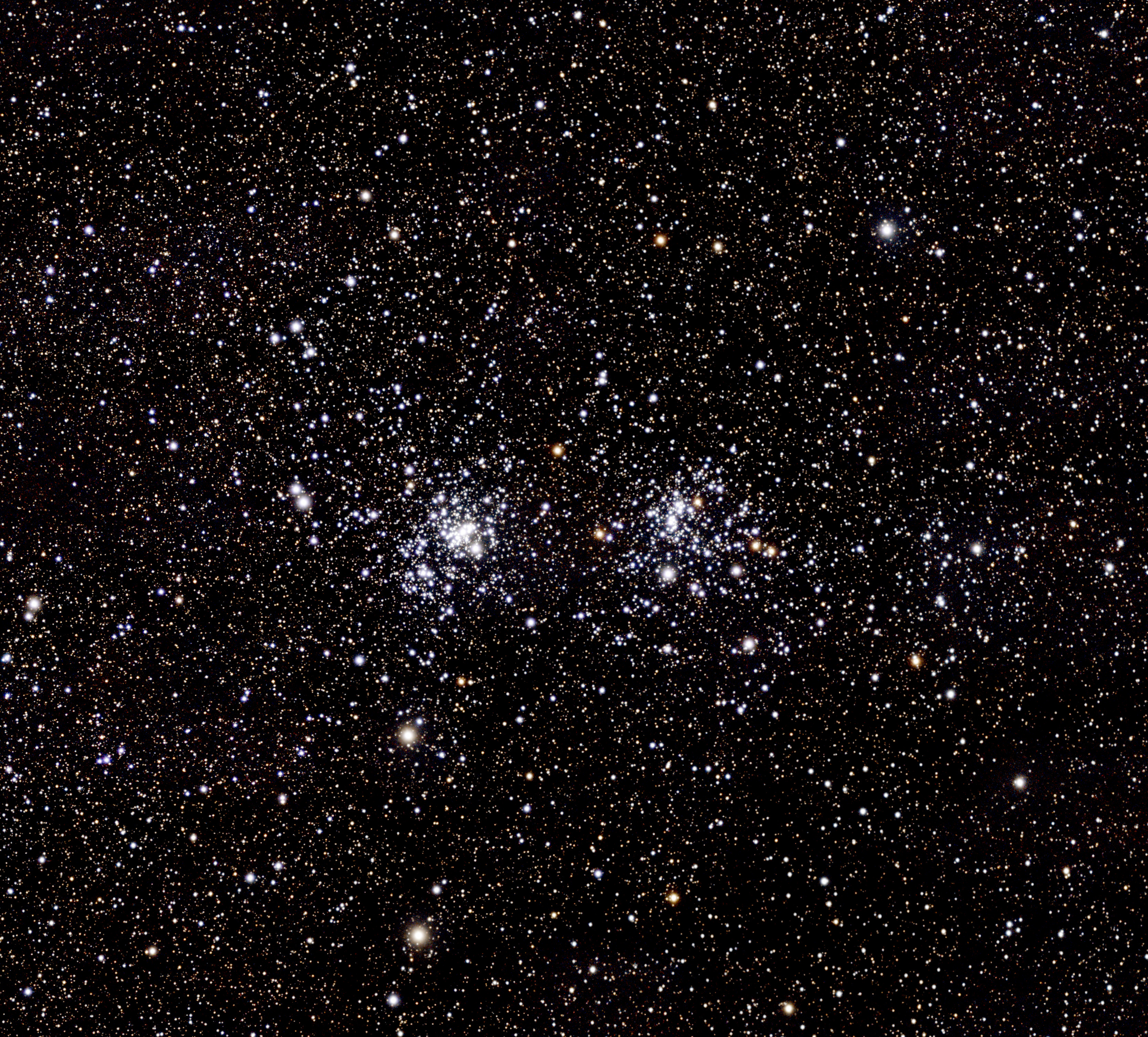
- Location of PR Persei (circled) near the Double Cluster (north is down)

Observation data Epoch J2000.0 Equinox J2000.0
- Constellation: Perseus
- Right ascension: 02^{h} 21^{m} 42.41^{s}
- Declination: +57° 51′ 46.1″
- Apparent magnitude (V): 7.7 – 8.2

Characteristics
- Evolutionary stage: Red supergiant
- Spectral type: M1 Iab-Ib
- Variable type: LC

Astrometry
Radial velocity (R_{v})	−45.9 km/s
Proper motion (μ)	RA: −0.857 mas/yr Dec.: −1.059 mas/yr
Parallax (π)	0.3621±0.0239 mas
Distance	9,000 ± 600 ly (2,800 ± 200 pc)

Details
Mass	9.2 M_{☉}
Radius	401 R_{☉}
Luminosity	27,542 L_{☉}
Surface gravity (log g)	0.89 cgs
Temperature	3,715 K
Metallicity [Fe/H]	−0.22 dex

Other designations
- PR Persei, BD+57°550, HD 14404, HIP 10995, SAO 23234, TIC 348442493, TYC 3694-152-1, IRAS 02181+5738, 2MASS J02214241+5751460, Gaia DR3 458512570887734528

Database references
SIMBAD	data

PR Persei (also known as HD 14404, HIP 10995, or BD+57 550) is a red supergiant star located in the constellation of Perseus in the northern celestial hemisphere. Classified as a variable star of spectral type M1-Iab-Ib, it exhibits mild brightness variations due to pulsations in its outer layers. It resides in the Milky Way galaxy, approximately 9,000 light-years from the Solar System. It can be seen near the Double Cluster of Perseus through a telescope or binoculars.

== Characteristics ==
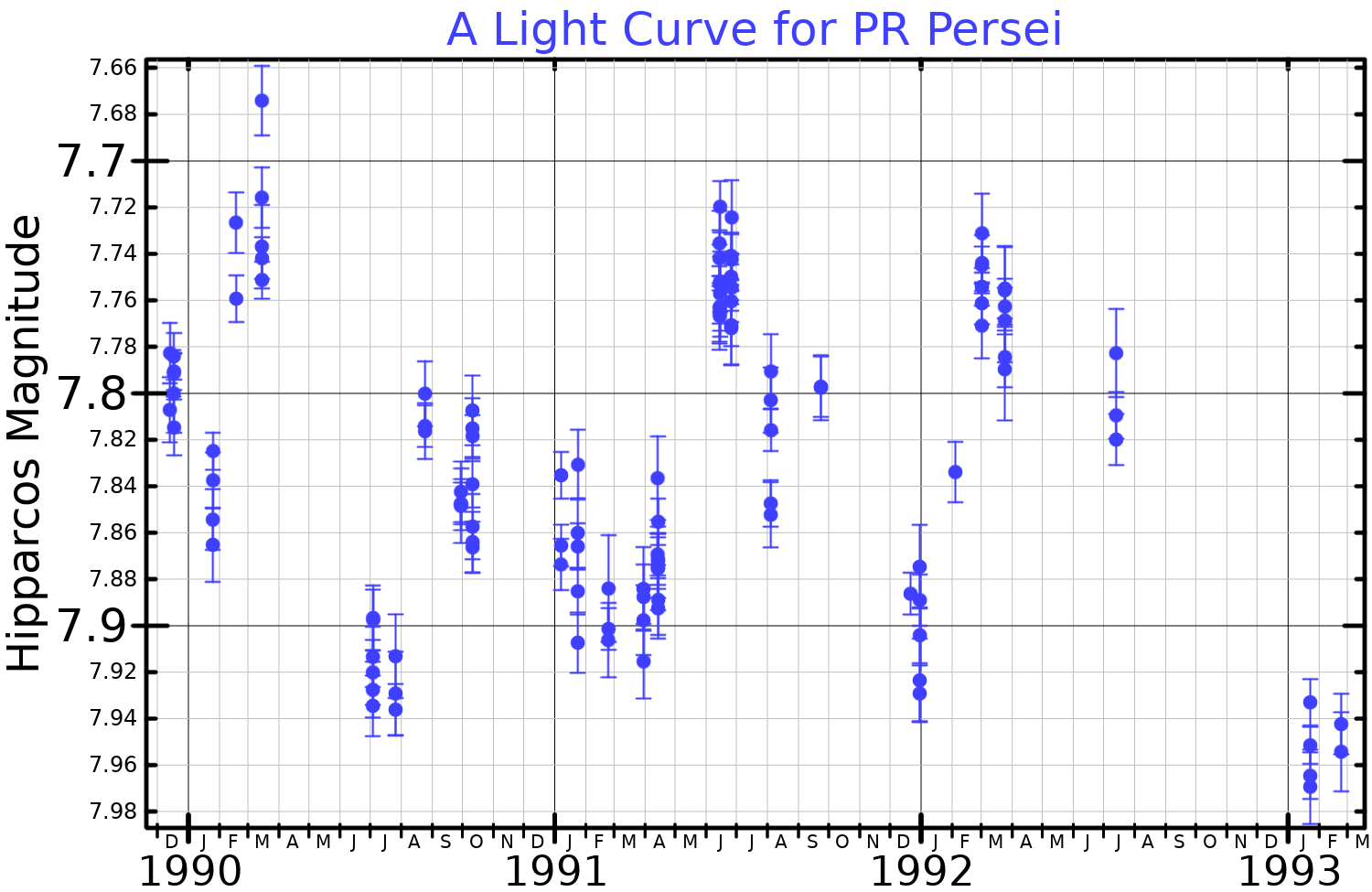
A light curve for PR Persei, plotted from Hipparcos data

PR Persei is a cool, luminous red supergiant with a spectral type of M1 Iab-Ib, indicating an intermediate luminosity class between Iab and Ib supergiants. The star is about 9.2 times as massive and 401 times as large as the sun. At a temperature of 3715 K, it radiates 27,542 times the solar luminosity.
