= Sigma Cygni =

Star in the constellation Cygnus

- Location of σ Cygni (circled)

Observation data Epoch J2000 Equinox ICRS
- Constellation: Cygnus
- Right ascension: 21^{h} 17^{m} 24.952^{s}
- Declination: +39° 23′ 40.847″
- Apparent magnitude (V): 4.233

Characteristics
- Evolutionary stage: supergiant
- Spectral type: B9 Iab
- U−B color index: −0.386
- B−V color index: +0.123

Astrometry
Radial velocity (R_{v})	−5.30±0.40 km/s
Proper motion (μ)	RA: +0.195 mas/yr Dec.: −3.609 mas/yr
Parallax (π)	1.1711±0.1498 mas
Distance	approx. 2,800 ly (approx. 900 pc)
Absolute magnitude (M_{V})	−6.18

Details
Mass	15 M_{☉}
Radius	49 ± 8 (Note: Applying the Stefan–Boltzmann law with a nominal solar effective temperature of 5,772 K: $$\sqrt{\biggl(\frac{5,772}{11,500}\biggr)^4 \cdot 10^{4.58}} = 49\ R_\odot$$.) R_{☉}
Luminosity	38,000+9,800 −7,800 L_{☉}
Surface gravity (log g)	1.85 cgs
Temperature	11,500±600 K
Metallicity [Fe/H]	0.0 dex
Rotational velocity (v sin i)	14 km/s
Age	16 Myr

Other designations
- σ Cyg, 67 Cyg, FK5 1558, GC 29786, HD 202850, HIP 05102, HR 8143, SAO 71165, 2MASS J21172494+3923402

Database references
SIMBAD	data

Sigma Cygni is a star in the constellation of Cygnus. Its name is a Bayer designation that is Latinized from σ Cygni and abbreviated Sigma Cyg or σ Cyg. This star is visible to the naked eye with an apparent visual magnitude of 4.2. It is located approximately 2,800 light years away from Earth and it belongs to the Cygnus OB4 stellar association of co-moving stars.

The stellar classification of Sigma Cygni is B9 Iab, which presents as a blue supergiant star. Its mass is estimated at 15 times that of the Sun, while its radius is estimated at 49 times solar. Because of its location in the galactic disk, σ Cyg is obstructed by interstellar dust. It is reddened by around 0.2 magnitudes and loses about 0.6 magnitudes at visual wavelengths. Allowing for this, the star is over 38,000 times as luminous as the sun.

Spectral analysis of the star showed that photospheric Si_{II} and He_{I} lines display a simultaneous, periodic variability. The periodicity was calculated at 1.59 hours in all three lines and it might be the result of stellar oscillations. No clear variation in the brightness has been detected.

The elemental composition of Sigma Cygni is anomalous. The star is enriched in helium, and has extremely high concentrations of nitrogen, calcium, cerium and europium, while carbon and aluminum are depleted relative to the Sun.
