= 2MASS J01020100−7122208 =

Blue Straggler star in Small Magellanic Cloud

- J01020100−7122208 is visible in the full-size image, below the cluster NGC 361. Credit: ESA/Hubble and Digitized Sky Survey 2

Observation data Epoch J2000 Equinox ICRS
- Constellation: Tucana
- Right ascension: 01^{h} 02^{m} 1.00^{s}
- Declination: −71° 22′ 20.8″

Astrometry
Radial velocity (R_{v})	296.7751 km/s
Proper motion (μ)	RA: 8.63 mas/yr Dec.: -0.938 mas/yr
Distance	8,740 ± 740 – 10,390 ± 1,170 pc

Details
Mass	1.09 ± 0.10 M_{☉}
Surface gravity (log g)	1.38 ± 0.15 cgs
Temperature	4,493 ± 102 K
Metallicity [Fe/H]	-1.30 ± 0.1 dex
Age	4.51 ± 1.44 Gyr

Other designations
- 2MASS J01020100-7122208, UCAC2 1342515, TIC 51994606, GALAH 140823002701048, AP J01020100-7122208, UCAC3 38-2405, DENIS J010200.9-712220, SSTISAGEMA J010200.99-712220.7, UCAC4 094-001121

Database references
SIMBAD	data

2MASS J01020100−7122208, or simply just J01020100−7122208, is a blue straggler located in the constellation of Tucana.

== Observation history ==
J01020100−7122208 was first catalogued in the 2 Micron All Sky Survey (2MASS). In 2018, a study was released suggesting that it is a yellow supergiant ejected from the Small Magellanic Cloud. Later studies suggested that it is instead a red giant that was ejected from the Galactic Center. In 2021, another study suggested that it is a halo star which was likely accreted by the Milky Way in the past. The same study also suggests that it is probably an evolved blue straggler.

== Physical properties ==
J01020100−7122208's mass and age suggest that it is probably an evolved blue straggler.
