= Macrograph =

Low magnification image

A macrograph or photomacrograph is an image taken at a scale that is visible to the naked eye, as opposed to a micrographic image, taken with a microscope. It is sometimes defined more precisely as an image at a scale of less than ten times magnification.

== Materials science ==
This term is often applied to a three-dimensional image taken of a material using a low-power stereomicroscope. These images are used in materials science, particularly in the study of stress fractures in metals. This method can also be used to assay the fine structure of steel, in a standardized test called the Baumann method that creates a sulfur print showing the amount and distribution of sulfur inclusions through the metal structure.
