= NGC 361 =

Open star cluster in the Small Magellanic Cloud

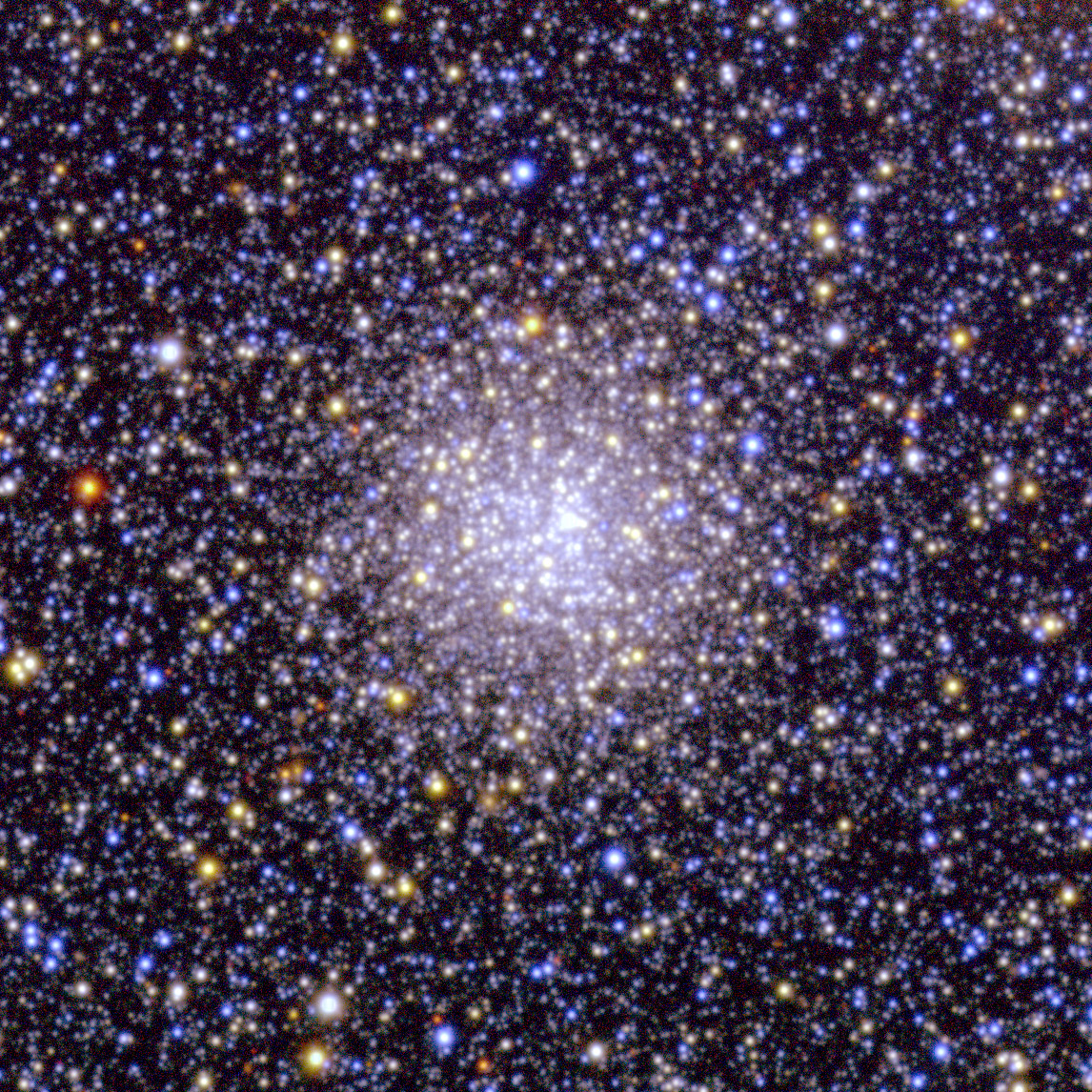
- NGC 361 with DECam; Credit: Digitized Sky Survey

Observation data (J2000 epoch)
- Right ascension: 01^{h} 02^{m} 10.1^{s}
- Declination: −71° 36′ 17″
- Distance: 180000
- Apparent magnitude (V): 12.24
- Apparent dimensions (V): 2.6′ × 2.6′

Physical characteristics
- Mass: 2.15×10^{5} M_{☉}
- Estimated age: 8.10±1.20 Gyr
- Other designations: ESO 051-SC 012.

Associations
- Constellation: Tucana

NGC 361 is an open cluster in the Small Magellanic Cloud. It is located in the constellation Tucana. It was discovered on September 6, 1826, by James Dunlop. It was described by Dreyer as "very very faint, pretty large, very little extended, very gradually brighter middle." At an aperture of 31.0 arcseconds, its apparent V-band magnitude is 12.24, but at this wavelength, it has 0.40 magnitudes of interstellar extinction.

NGC 361 is about 8.1 billion years old. Its estimated mass is 2.15×10^{5} M_{☉}, and its total luminosity is 1.04×10^{5} L_{☉}, leading to a mass-to-luminosity ratio of 2.07 M_{☉}/L_{☉}. All else equal, older star clusters have higher mass-to-luminosity ratios; that is, they have lower luminosities for the same mass.

== See also ==
- List of NGC objects (1–1000)
