= Blue supergiant =

Hot, luminous star with a spectral type of A9 or earlier

A blue supergiant (BSG) is a hot, luminous star, often referred to as an OB supergiant. They are usually considered to be those with luminosity class I and spectral class B9 or earlier, although sometimes A-class supergiants are also deemed blue supergiants.

Blue supergiants are found towards the top left of the Hertzsprung–Russell diagram, above and to the right of the main sequence. By analogy to the red giant branch for low-mass stars, this region is also called the blue giant branch. They are larger than the Sun but smaller than a red supergiant, with surface temperatures of 10,000–50,000 K and luminosities from about 10,000 to a million times that of the Sun. They are most often an evolutionary phase between high-mass, hydrogen-fusing main-sequence stars and helium-fusing red supergiants, although new research suggests they could be the result of stellar mergers.

The majority of supergiants are also blue (B-type) supergiants; blue supergiants from classes O9.5 to B2 are even more common than their main sequence counterparts. More post-main-sequence blue supergiants are observed than what is expected from theoretical models, which expect blue supergiants to be short-lived. This results in the blue supergiant problem, although unusual stellar interiors (such as hotter blue supergiants having oversized hydrogen-fusing cores and cooler ones having undersized helium-fusing cores) may explain this.

== Formation ==
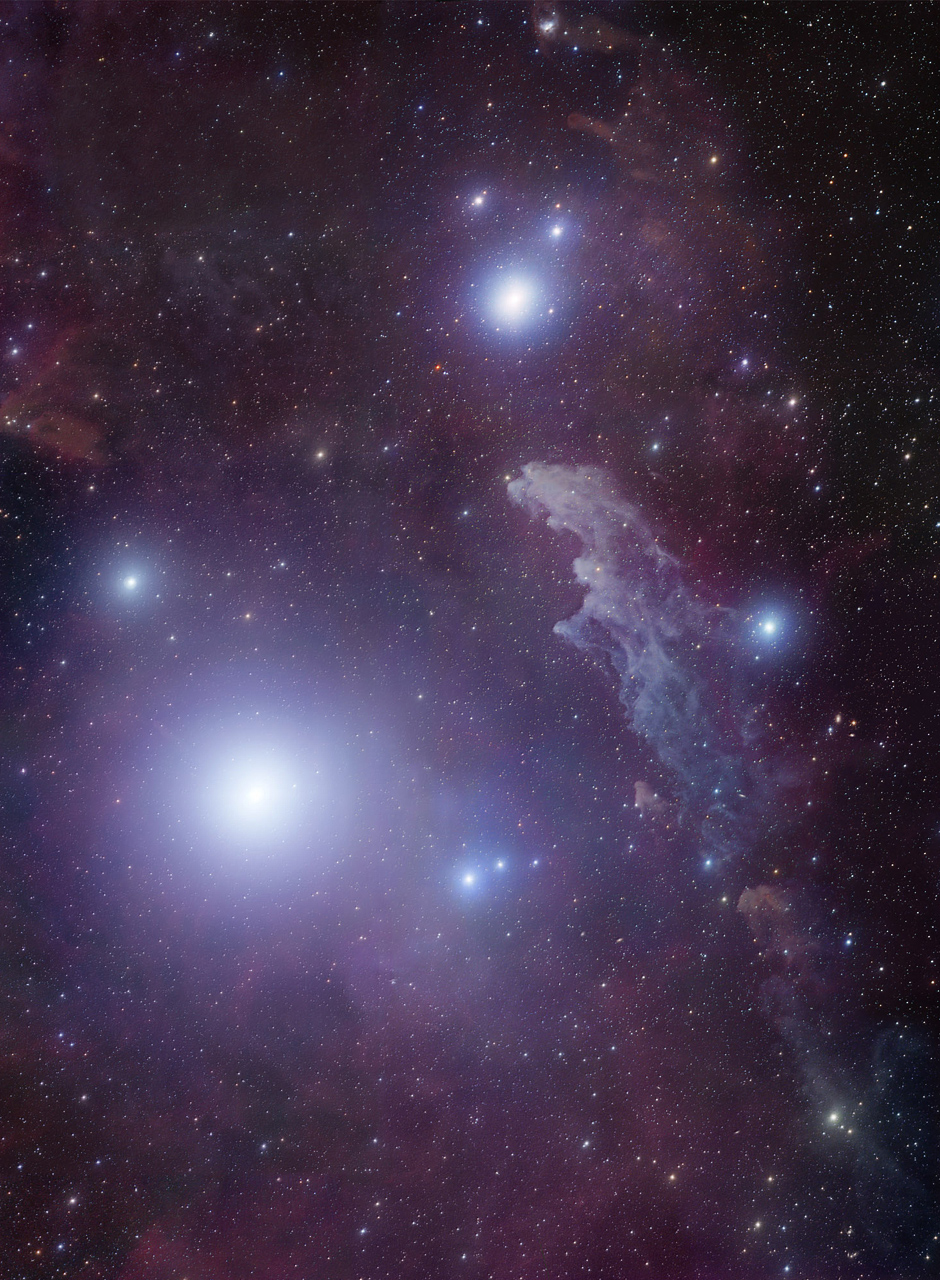
Rigel and the IC 2118 nebula which it illuminates.

It was once believed that blue supergiants originated from a "feeding" with the interstellar medium when stars passed through interstellar dust clouds, although the current consensus is that blue supergiants are evolved high-mass stars, a natural consequence of stellar evolution, larger and more luminous than main-sequence stars. O-type and early B-type stars with initial masses around 10–300 M_{☉} evolve away from the main sequence in just a few million years as their hydrogen is consumed and heavy elements (with atomic numbers of 26 (Fe) and less) start to appear near the surface of the star. These stars usually become blue supergiants, although it is possible that some of them (particularly the more massive ones) evolve directly to Wolf–Rayet stars. Expansion into the supergiant stage occurs when hydrogen in the core of the star is depleted and hydrogen shell burning starts, but it may also be caused as heavy elements are dredged up to the surface by convection and mass loss due to radiation pressure increases.

Blue supergiants are newly evolved from the main sequence, have extremely high luminosities, high mass loss rates, and are generally unstable. Many of them become luminous blue variables (LBVs) with episodes of extreme mass loss. Lower mass blue supergiants continue to expand until they become red supergiants. In the process they must spend some time as yellow supergiants or yellow hypergiants, but this expansion occurs in just a few thousand years and so these stars are rare. Higher mass red supergiants blow away their outer atmospheres and evolve back to blue supergiants, and possibly onwards to Wolf–Rayet stars. Depending on the exact mass and composition of a red supergiant, it can execute a number of blue loops before either exploding as a type II supernova or finally dumping enough of its outer layers to become a blue supergiant again, less luminous than the first time but more unstable. If such a star can pass through the yellow evolutionary void it is expected that it becomes one of the lower luminosity LBVs.

The most massive blue supergiants are too luminous to retain an extensive atmosphere and they never expand into a red supergiant. The dividing line is approximately 40 M_{☉}, although the coolest and largest red supergiants develop from stars with initial masses of 15–25 M_{☉}. It is not clear whether more massive blue supergiants can lose enough mass to evolve safely into old age as a Wolf Rayet star and finally a white dwarf, or they reach the Wolf Rayet stage and explode as supernovae, or they explode as supernovae while blue supergiants.

Supernova progenitors are most commonly red supergiants and it was believed that only red supergiants could explode as supernovae. SN 1987A, however, forced astronomers to re-examine this theory, as its progenitor, Sanduleak -69° 202, was a B3 blue supergiant. Now it is known from observation that almost any class of evolved high-mass star, including blue and yellow supergiants, can explode as a supernova although theory still struggles to explain how in detail. While most supernovae are of the relatively homogeneous type II-P and are produced by red supergiants, blue supergiants are observed to produce supernovae with a wide range of luminosities, durations, and spectral types, sometimes sub-luminous like SN 1987A, sometimes super-luminous such as many type IIn supernovae.

== Properties ==
Spectrum of a B2 star.

Because of their extreme masses they have relatively short lifespans and are mainly observed in young cosmic structures such as open clusters, the arms of spiral galaxies, and in irregular galaxies. They are rarely observed in spiral galaxy cores, elliptical galaxies, or globular clusters, most of which are believed to be composed of older stars, although the core of the Milky Way has recently been found to be home to several massive open clusters and associated young hot stars.

The best known example is Rigel, the brightest star in the constellation of Orion. Its mass is about 20 times that of the Sun, and its luminosity is around 117,000 times greater. Despite their rarity and their short lives, they are heavily represented among the stars visible to the naked eye.

Blue supergiants have fast stellar winds and the most luminous, called hypergiants, have spectra dominated by emission lines that indicate strong continuum driven mass loss. Blue supergiants show varying quantities of heavy elements in their spectra, depending on their age and the efficiency with which the products of nucleosynthesis in the core are convected up to the surface. Quickly rotating supergiants can be highly mixed and show high proportions of helium and even heavier elements while still burning hydrogen at the core; these stars show spectra very similar to a Wolf Rayet star.

Many blue supergiant stars are Alpha Cygni variables.

While the stellar wind from a red supergiant is dense and slow, the wind from a blue supergiant is fast but sparse. When a red supergiant becomes a blue supergiant, the faster wind it produces impacts the already emitted slow wind and causes the outflowing material to condense into a thin shell. In some cases, several concentric faint shells can be seen from successive episodes of mass loss, either previous blue loops from the red supergiant stage, or eruptions such as LBV outbursts.

== Examples ==
- Rigel (β Orionis), a blue (B-type) supergiant, believed to be evolving to the red supergiant phase
- Deneb (Alpha Cygni), a blue-white (A-type) supergiant, believed to be evolving to the red supergiant phase
- Mu Sagittarii, a multiple star system containing a B-type blue supergiant
- Alnitak, an O-type blue supergiant
- Eta Canis Majoris, a blue supergiant of spectral type B5Ia
- UW Canis Majoris (UW CMa), two blue (O-type) supergiants in a binary system
- Zeta Puppis (Naos), a blue (O-type) supergiant, spectral type O4I(n)fp
- Alnilam (Epsilon Orionis) B-type supergiant, spectral type B0Ia, central star of Orion's Belt
- Saiph (Kappa Orionis) B-type supergiant, spectral type B0.5Ia
- Chi2 Orionis B-type supergiant, spectral type B2Ia
- 5 Persei, B-type supergiant, spectral type B5Ia
- 10 Persei, B-type supergiant, spectral type B2Ia
- Omicron² Canis Majoris, B-type supergiant, spectral type B3Ia
- Lambda Cephei, O-type supergiant, spectral type O6.5I(n)fp
- Mu Sagittarii, B-type supergiant, spectral type B8Iab(e)
- 4 Lacertae, B-type supergiant, spectral type B9Iab, believed to be in a blue loop
- Nu Cephei, A-type supergiant, spectral type A2Ia
- Alpha Camelopardalis, O-type supergiant, spectral type O9Ia
- Sigma Cygni, B-type supergiant, spectral type B9Iab
