= Naked eye =

Human vision, unaided by optical instruments

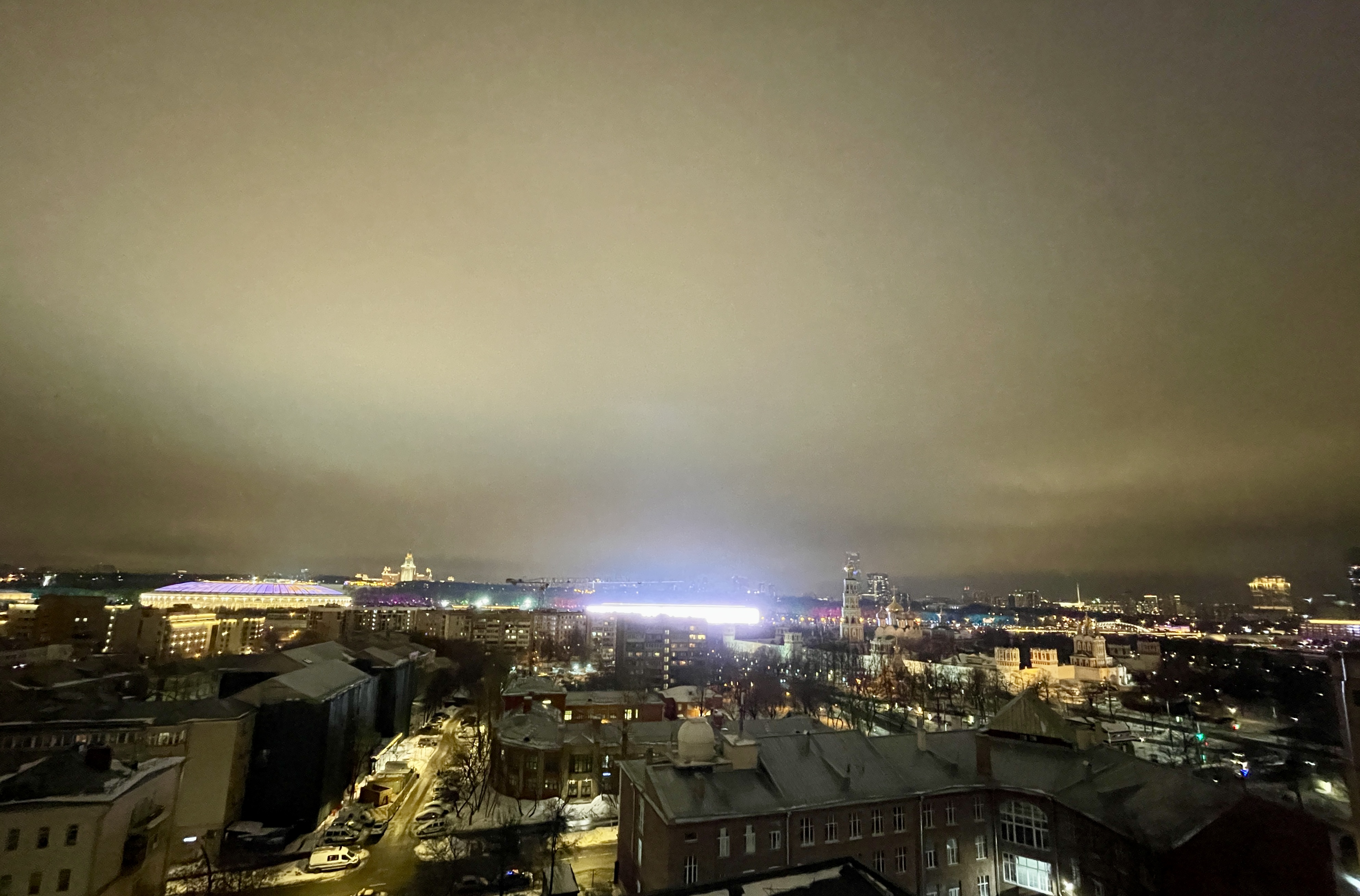
Light pollution limits viewing of celestial sights, as in this night scene from Moscow

Naked eye, also called bare eye or unaided eye, is the practice of engaging in visual perception unaided by a magnifying, light-collecting optical instrument, such as a telescope or microscope, or eye protection.

In astronomy, the naked eye may be used to observe celestial events and objects visible without equipment, such as conjunctions, passing comets, meteor showers, and the brightest asteroids, including 4 Vesta. Sky lore and various tests demonstrate an impressive variety of phenomena visible to the unaided eye.

== Basic properties ==
Some basic properties of the human eye are:

- Quick autofocus from distances of 25 cm (young people) to 50 cm (most people 50 years and older) to infinity.
- Angular resolution: about 1 arcminute, approximately 0.017° or 0.0003 radians, which corresponds to 0.3 m at a 1 km distance.
- Field of view (FOV): simultaneous visual perception in an area of about 160° × 175°.
- Ability to see faint stars up to +8 magnitude under a perfectly dark sky.
- Photometry (brightness) to ±10% or 1% of intensity – in a range between night and day of 1:10,000,000,000.
- Symmetries of 10–20' (3–6 m per 1 km), see the measurements of Tycho Brahe.
- Interval estimations (for example at a plan on paper) to 3–5%.
- Unconscious recognizing of movement (that is "alarm system" and reflexes).

Visual perception allows a person to gain much information about their surroundings:

- the distances and 3-dimensional position of things and persons
- the vertical (plumb line) and the slope of plane objects
- luminosities and colors and their changes by time and direction

== In astronomy ==
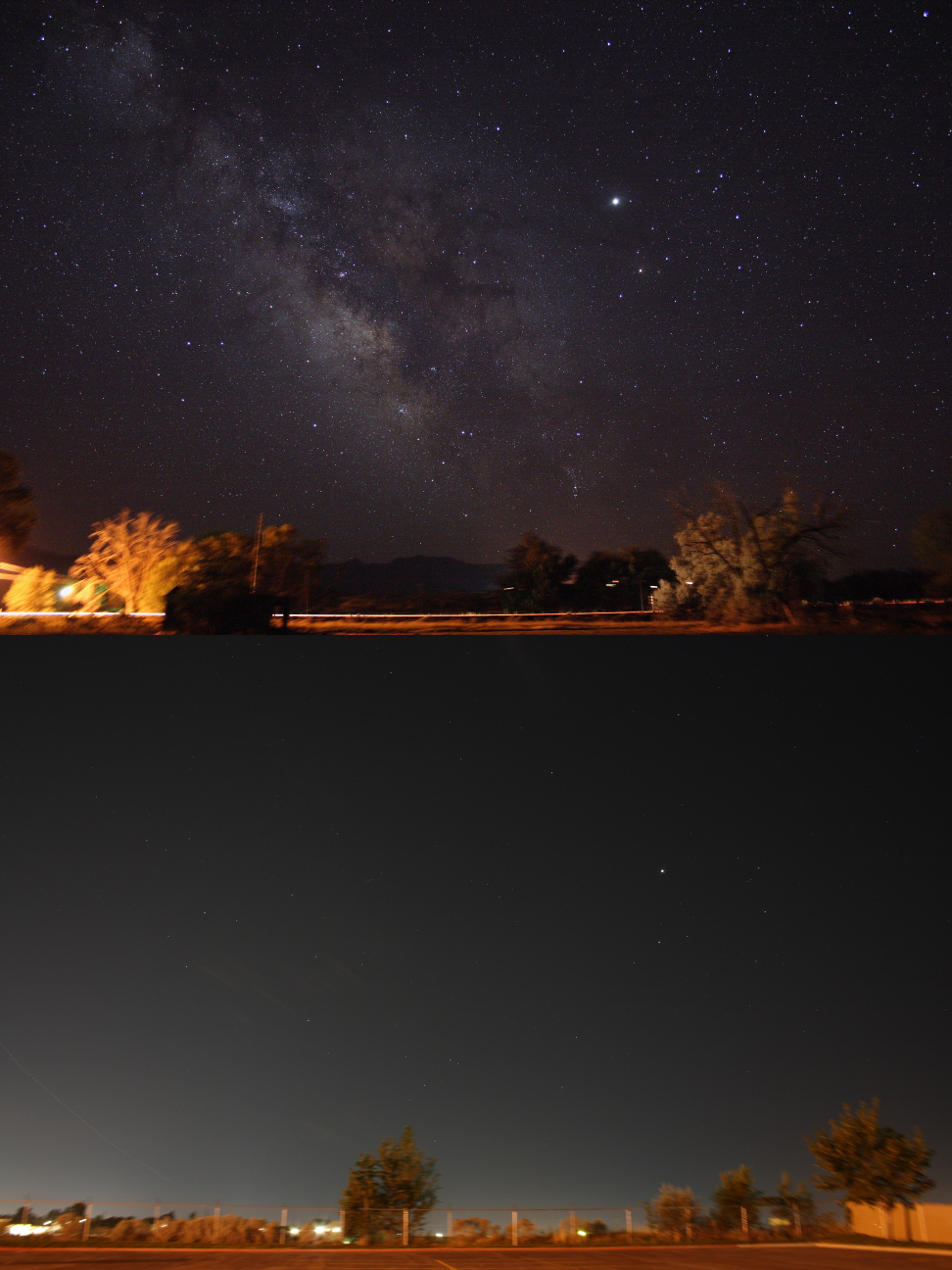
A photographic approximation of a naked eye view of the night sky from a small rural town (top) and a metropolitan area (bottom). Light pollution dramatically reduces the visibility of stars.

The visibility of astronomical objects is strongly affected by light pollution. Even a few hundred kilometers away from a metropolitan area where the sky can appear to be very dark, it is still the residual light pollution that sets the limit on the visibility of faint objects. For most people, these are likely to be the best observing conditions within their reach. Under such "typical" dark sky conditions, the naked eye can see stars with an apparent magnitude up to +6^{m}. Under perfect dark sky conditions where all light pollution is absent, stars as faint as +8^{m} might be visible.

The angular resolution of the naked eye is about 1′; however, some people have sharper vision than that. There is anecdotal evidence that people had seen the Galilean moons of Jupiter before telescopes were invented. Uranus and Vesta had most probably been seen but could not be recognized as planets because they appear so faint even at maximum brightness; Uranus's magnitude varies from +5.3^{m} to +5.9^{m}, and Vesta's from +5.2^{m} to +8.5^{m} (so that it is only visible near its opposition dates). Uranus, when discovered in 1781, was the first planet discovered using technology (a telescope) rather than being spotted by the naked eye.

Theoretically, in a typical dark sky, the dark adapted human eye would see about 5,600 stars brighter than +6^{m} while in perfect dark sky conditions about 45,000 stars brighter than +8^{m} might be visible. In practice, the atmospheric extinction and dust reduces this number somewhat. In the center of a city, where the naked-eye limiting magnitude due to extreme amounts of light pollution can be as low as 2^{m}, as few as 50 stars are visible. Colors can be seen but this is limited by the fact that the eye uses rods instead of cones to view fainter stars.

The visibility of diffuse objects such as star clusters and galaxies is much more strongly affected by light pollution than is that of planets and stars. Under typical dark conditions only a few such objects are visible. These include the Pleiades, h/χ Persei, the Andromeda Galaxy, the Carina Nebula, the Orion Nebula, Omega Centauri, 47 Tucanae, the Ptolemy Cluster Messier 7 near the tail of Scorpius and the globular cluster M13 in Hercules. The Triangulum Galaxy (M33) is a difficult averted vision object and only visible at all if it is higher than 50° in the sky. The globular clusters M 3 in Canes Venatici and M 92 in Hercules are also visible with the naked eye under such conditions. Under really dark sky conditions, however, M33 is easy to see, even in direct vision. Many other Messier objects are also visible under such conditions. The most distant objects that have been seen by the naked eye are nearby bright galaxies such as Centaurus A, Bode's Galaxy, Sculptor Galaxy, and Messier 83.

Five planets can be recognized as planets from Earth with the naked eye: Mercury, Venus, Mars, Jupiter, and Saturn. Under typical dark sky conditions Uranus (magnitude +5.8) can be seen as well with averted vision, as can the asteroid Vesta at its brighter oppositions. Under perfect dark sky conditions Neptune may be visible to the naked eye only if Neptune is at its maximum brightness (magnitude +7.8). The Sun and the Moon—the remaining noticeable naked-eye objects of the Solar System—are sometimes added to make seven "planets". During daylight only the Moon and Sun are obvious naked eye objects, but in many cases Venus can be spotted in daylight and in rarer cases Jupiter. Close to sunset and sunrise, bright stars like Sirius or even Canopus can be spotted with the naked eye as long as one knows the exact position in which to look. Historically, the zenith of naked-eye astronomy was the work of Tycho Brahe (1546–1601). He built an extensive observatory to make precise measurements of the heavens without any instruments for magnification. In 1610, Galileo Galilei pointed a telescope towards the sky. He immediately discovered the moons of Jupiter and the phases of Venus, among other things.

Meteor showers are better observed by naked eye than with binoculars. Such showers include the Perseids (10–12 August) and the December Geminids. Some 100 satellites per night, the International Space Station and the Milky Way are other popular objects visible to the naked eye.

On 19 March 2008, a major gamma-ray burst (GRB) known as GRB 080319B, set a new record as the farthest object that can be seen from Earth with the naked eye. It occurred about 7.5 billion years ago, the light taking that long to reach Earth.

== In geodesy and navigation ==
Many other things can be estimated without an instrument. If an arm is stretched the span of the hand corresponds to an angle of 18 to 20°. The distance of a person, just covered up by the outstretched thumbnail, is about 100 meters. The vertical can be estimated to about 2° and, in the Northern Hemisphere, observing the Pole Star and using a protractor can give the observer's geographic latitude, up to 1 degree of accuracy.

The Babylonians, Mayans, ancient Egyptians, ancient Indians, and Chinese measured all the basics of their respective time and calendar systems by naked eye:

- the length of a year and a month to ±0.1 hour or to better than 1 minute (0.001%)
- the 24 hours of a day, and the equinoxes
- the periods of the planets were calculated by Mayan astronomers, to within 5 to 10 minutes accuracy in the case of Venus and Mars.

In a similar manner star occultations by the Moon can be observed. By using a digital clock an accuracy of 0.2 second is possible. This represents only 200 meters at the Moon's distance of 385,000 km.

== Small objects and maps ==
Observing a nearby small object without a magnifying glass or a microscope, the size of the object depends on the viewing distance. Under normal lighting conditions (light source ~ 1000 lumens at height 600–700 mm, viewing angle ~ 35 degrees) the angular size recognized by naked eye will be round 1 arc minute = 1/60 degrees = 0.0003 radians. At a viewing distance of 16", or ~400 mm, which is considered a normal reading distance in the US, the smallest object resolution will be ~ 0.116 mm. For inspection purposes laboratories use a viewing distance of 200–250 mm, which gives the smallest size of the object recognizable to the naked eye of ~0.058–0.072 mm (58–72 micrometers). The accuracy of a measurement ranges from 0.1 to 0.3 mm and depends on the experience of the observer. The latter figure is the usual positional accuracy of faint details in maps and technical plans.

== Environmental pollution ==
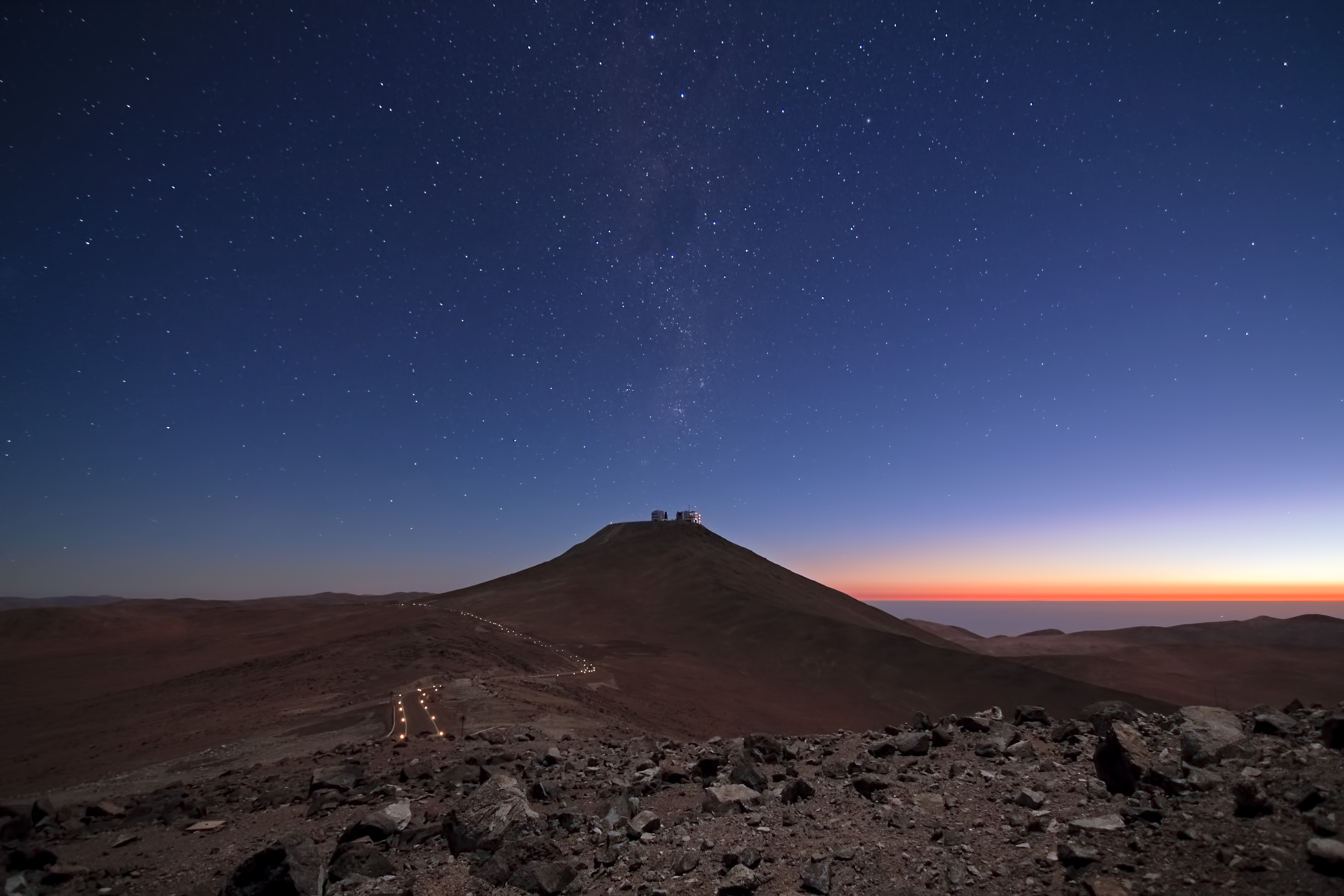
The Milky Way is visible over the Very Large Telescope, demonstrating clear atmosphere above Paranal Observatory.

A clean atmosphere is indicated by the fact that the Milky Way is visible. Comparing the zenith with the horizon shows how the "blue quality" is degraded depending on the amount of air pollution and dust. The twinkling of a star is an indication of the turbulence of the air. This is of importance in meteorology and for the "seeing" of astronomy.

Light pollution is a significant problem for amateur astronomers but becomes less late at night when many lights are shut off. Air dust can be seen even far away from a city by its "light dome".

== See also ==
- Macrograph
- Satellite flare
  - ISS flare

== Literature ==
- Davidson, N.: Sky Phenomena: A Guide to Naked Eye Observation of the Heavens. FlorisBooks (208p), ISBN 0-86315-168-X, Edinburgh 1993.
- Gerstbach G.: Auge und Sehen – der lange Weg zu digitalem Erkennen. Astro Journal Sternenbote, 20p., Vol.2000/8, Vienna 2000.
- Kahmen H. (Ed.): Geodesy for Geotechnical and Structural Engineering. Proceedings, Eisenstadt 1999.
