= NGC 869 =

Open cluster in the constellation Perseus

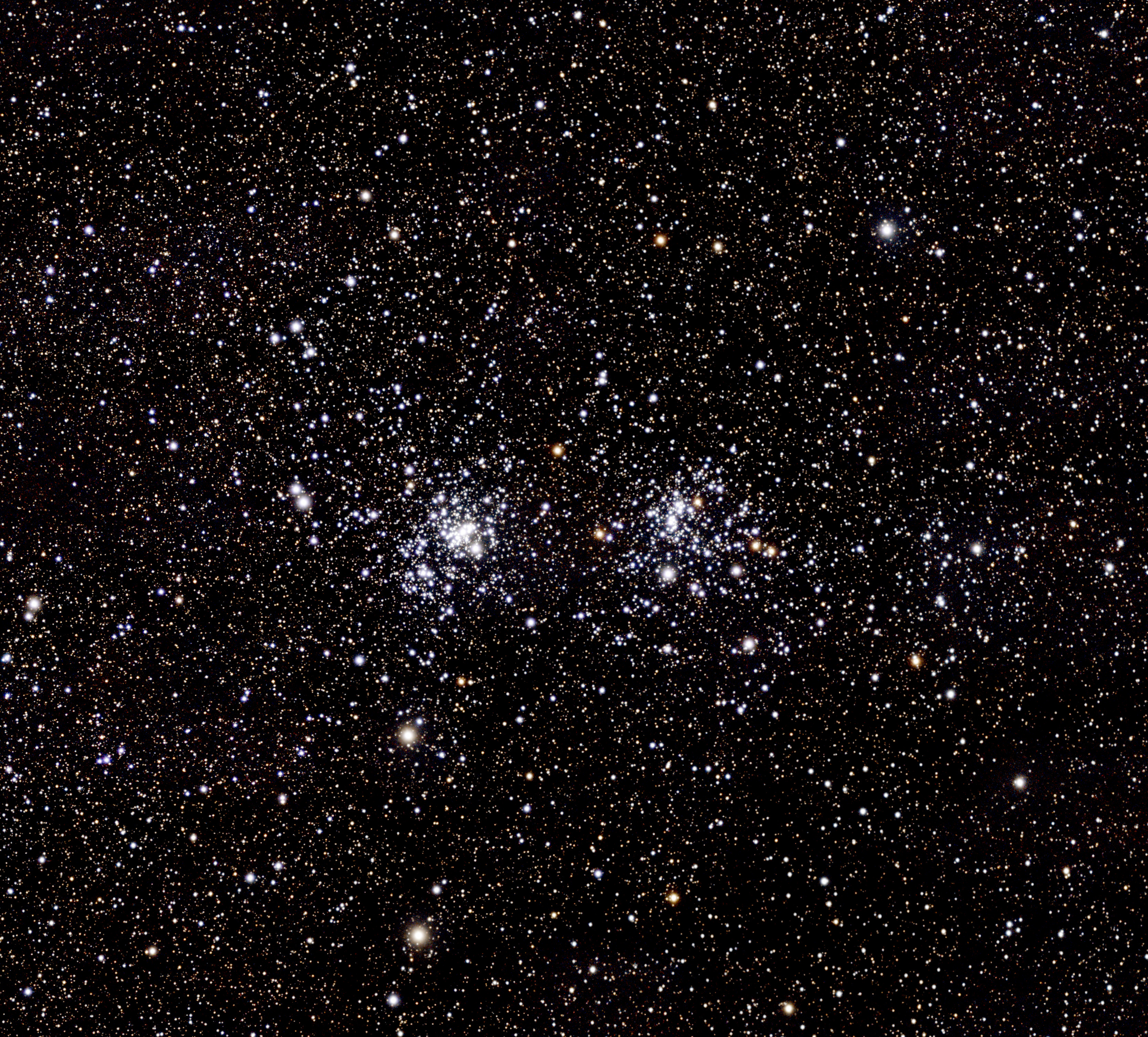
- The Double Cluster, NGC 869 (left) and NGC 884 (right) with north to the bottom

Observation data (J2000 epoch)
- Right ascension: 02^{h} 19.1^{m}
- Declination: +57° 09′
- Distance: 7,460 ly (2,290 pc)
- Apparent magnitude (V): 5.3
- Apparent dimensions (V): 18′

Physical characteristics
- Radius: 33.15 ly
- Estimated age: 14 Ma
- Other designations: Caldwell 14, Cr 24, Mel 13, h Per, h Persei

Associations
- Constellation: Perseus

NGC 869 (also known as h Persei) is an open cluster of stars located around 7,460 light years away in the constellation of Perseus. The cluster is around 14 million years old. It is the west component of the Double Cluster with NGC 884.

NGC 869 and 884 are often designated h and χ (chi) Persei, respectively. Some confusion surrounds what Bayer intended by these designations. It is sometimes claimed that Bayer did not resolve the pair into two patches of nebulosity, and that χ refers to the Double Cluster and h to a nearby star. Bayer's Uranometria chart for Perseus does not show them as nebulous objects, but his chart for Cassiopeia does, and they are described as Nebulosa Duplex in Schiller's Coelum Stellatum Christianum, which was assembled with Bayer's help. The clusters are both located in the Perseus OB1 association, a few hundred light years apart from each other. The clusters were first recorded by Hipparchus, thus have been known since antiquity.

The Double Cluster is often photographed and observed with small telescopes. The clusters are visible with the unaided eye between the constellations of Perseus and Cassiopeia as a brighter patch in the winter Milky Way. In small telescopes, the cluster appears as an assemblage of bright stars located in a rich star field. Dominated by bright blue stars, the cluster also hosts a few orange stars.
