= NGC 884 =

Open cluster in the constellation Perseus

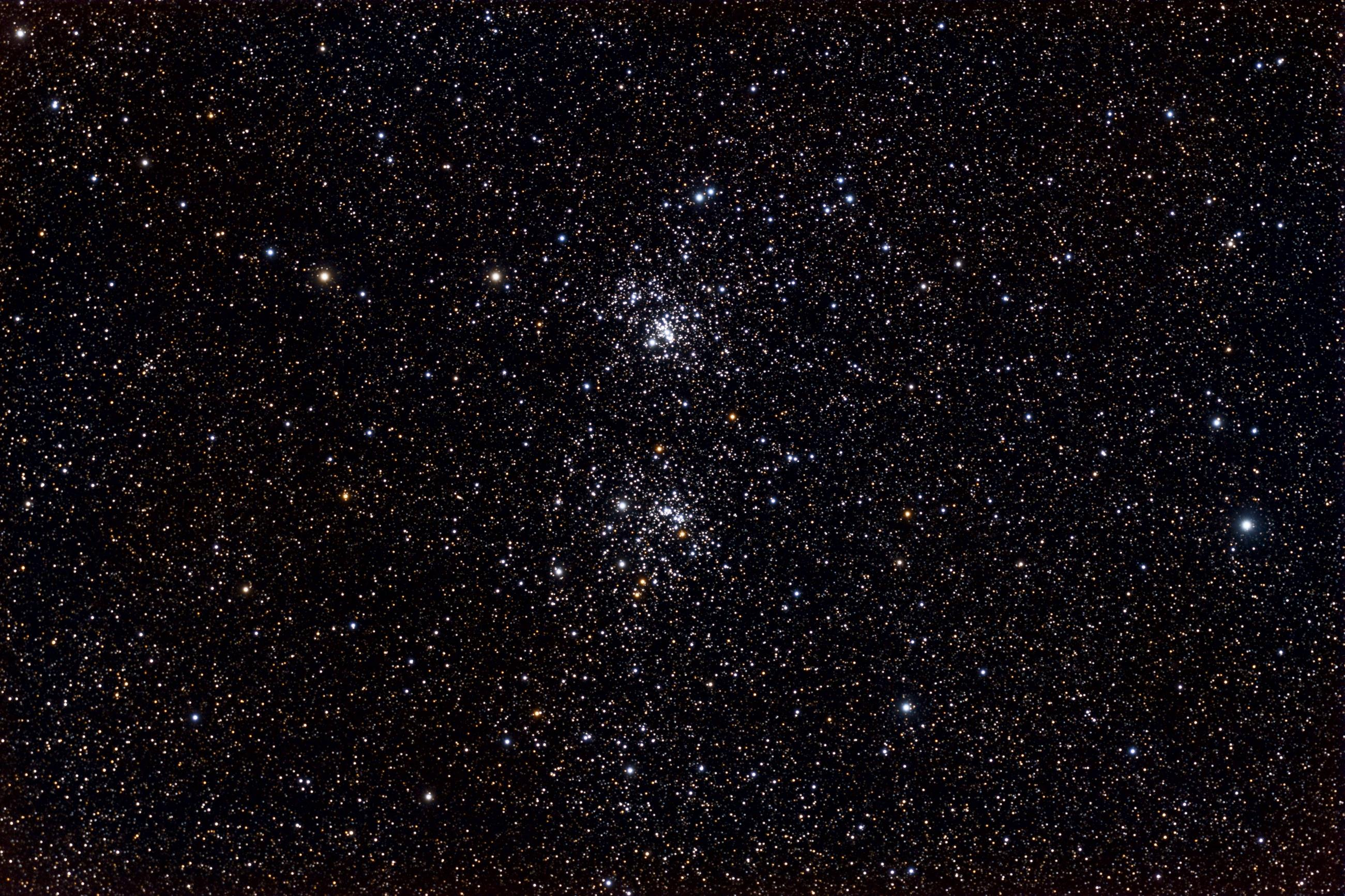
- The Double Cluster, NGC 869 (top) and NGC 884 (bottom) with north to the left

Observation data (J2000 epoch)
- Right ascension: 02^{h} 22.0^{m}
- Declination: +57° 08′
- Distance: 7.6 kly (2.3 kpc)
- Apparent magnitude (V): 6.1
- Apparent dimensions (V): 18′

Physical characteristics
- Estimated age: 14 Myr
- Other designations: Caldwell 14, Cr 25, Mel 14, Raab 10, OCl 353, Chi Per Cluster, χ Persei

Associations
- Constellation: Perseus

NGC 884 (also known as χ Persei) is an open cluster of stars located 7,640 light years away in the constellation of Perseus. It is the east component of the Double Cluster with NGC 869. NGC 869 and 884 are often designated h and χ Persei, respectively. The cluster is about 14 million years old. Located in the Perseus OB1 association, both clusters are located physically close to one another, only a few hundred light years apart. The clusters were first recorded by Hipparchus, thus have been known since antiquity.

The two clusters are often photographed or observed by amateur astronomers with small telescopes. The clusters are visible with the unaided eye between the constellations of Perseus and Cassiopeia as a brighter patch in the winter Milky Way. The Double Cluster was also included in the Caldwell catalogue, a catalogue of astronomical objects for amateur observation.

In small telescopes, the cluster appears as a group of bright stars in a rich star field. Most of its bright stars are blue, with a few orange stars. Both clusters can be seen together at low magnification.
