= Perseus OB1 =

Stellar association

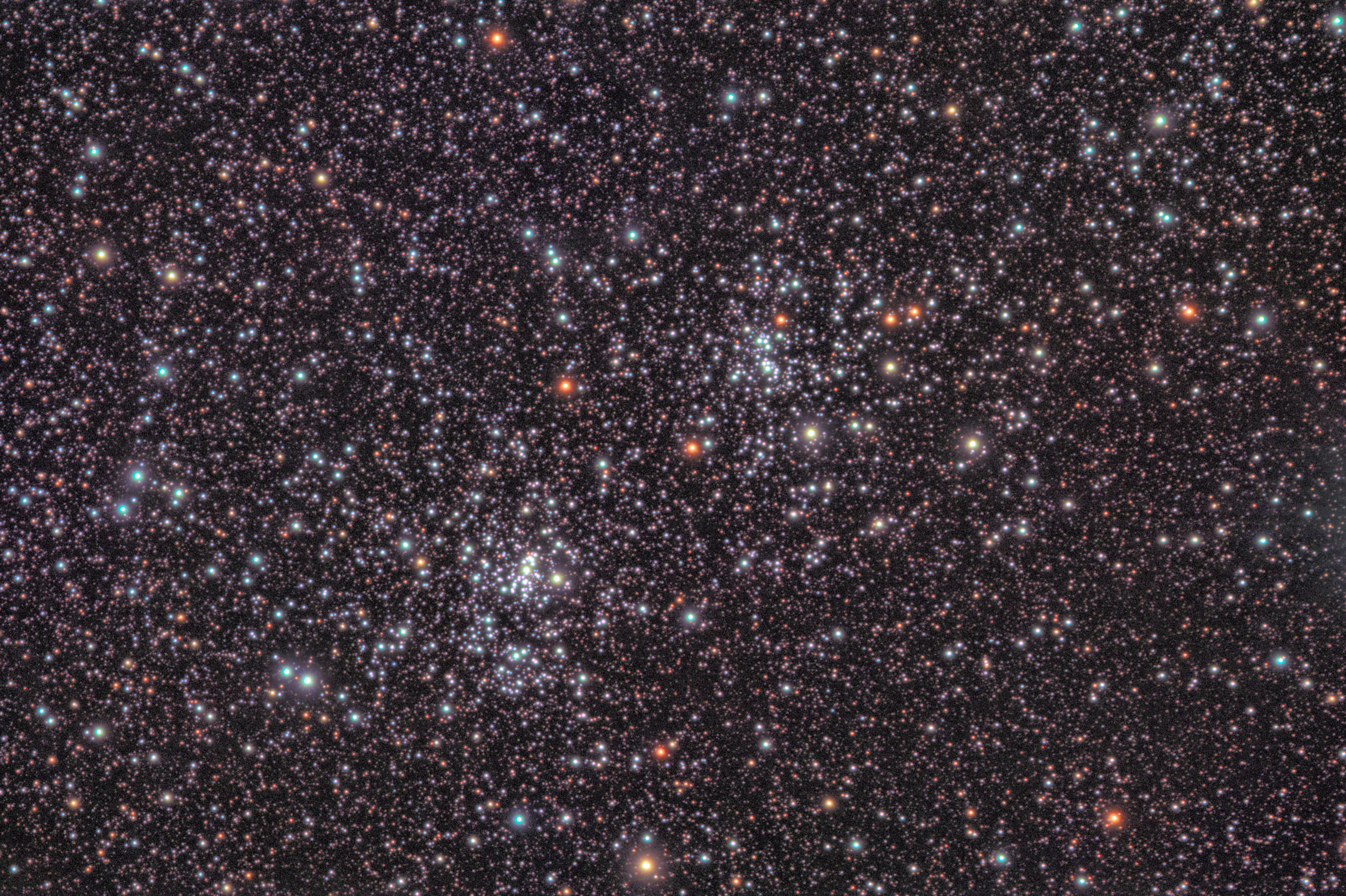
- Double Cluster at the heart of Per OB1; Credit: Chrisguidry

Observation data (J2000 epoch)
- Constellation: Perseus
- Right ascension: 02^{h} 21^{m}
- Declination: +57.6°
- Mean distance: 6.0 kly (1.83 kpc)
- Span: 1,000 × 750 light years
- Radial velocity: −43.4 km/s

Physical characteristics
- Members: 149
- OB stars: ≥65
- Other designations: Per OB1

Perseus OB1 is an OB association in the Northern Celestial Hemisphere in the constellation Perseus. It is centered on the Double Cluster (NGC 869 and NGC 884), and has lent its name to the Perseus Arm of the Milky Way. The brightest member of the association is the blue supergiant 9 Persei.
