= Double Cluster =

Open clusters in the constellation Perseus

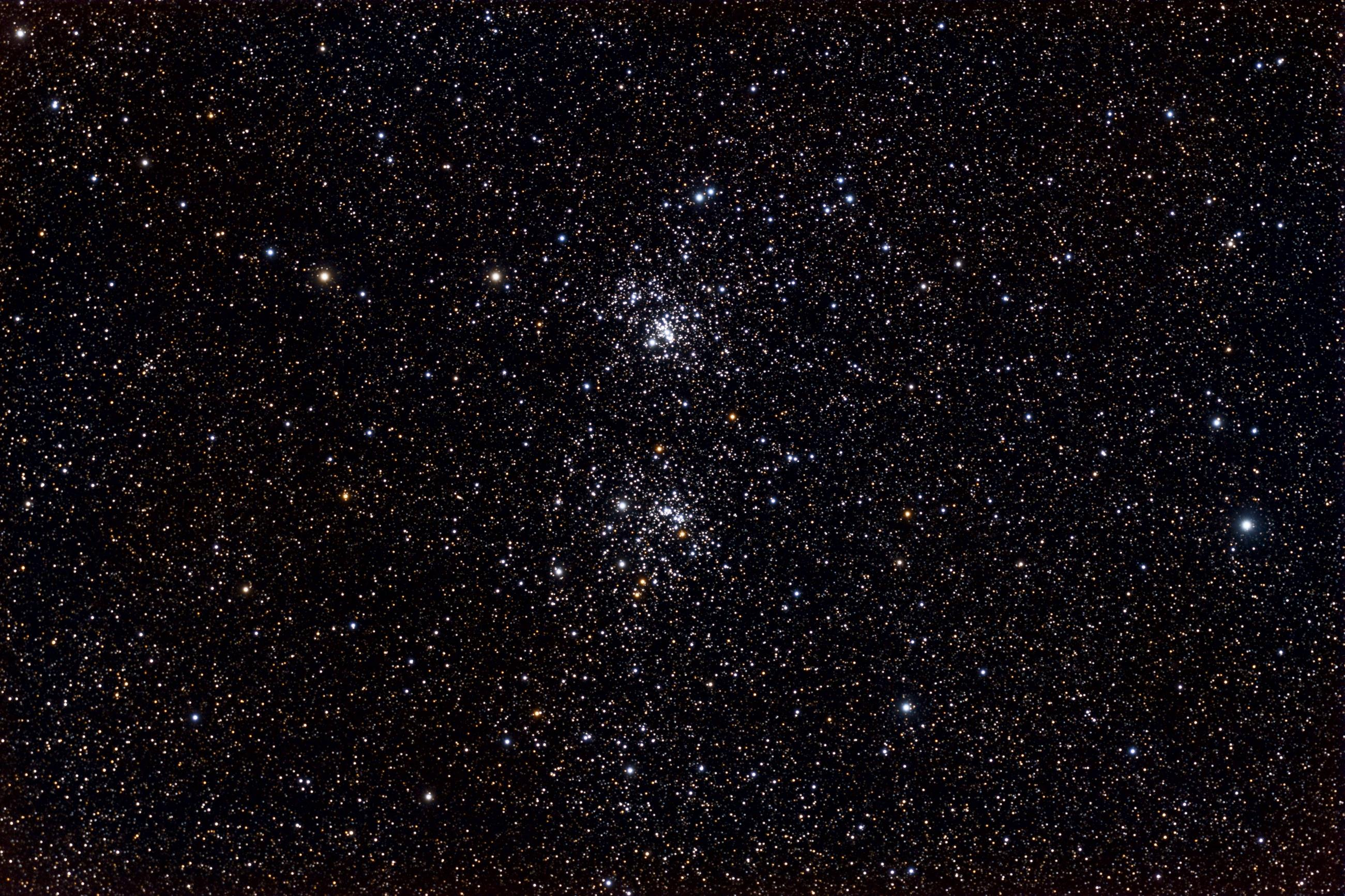
- The Double Cluster, NGC 869 (above) and NGC 884 (below) with north to the left

Observation data (J2000.0 epoch)
- Right ascension: 2^{h} 20^{m}
- Declination: 57° 08′
- Distance: 7,460 and 7,640 ly (2,290 and 2,340 pc)
- Apparent magnitude (V): 3.7 and 3.8
- Apparent dimensions (V): 60′

Physical characteristics
- Other designations: Caldwell 14

Associations
- Constellation: Perseus

The Double Cluster, also known as Caldwell 14, consists of the open clusters NGC 869 and NGC 884 (often designated h Persei and χ (chi) Persei, respectively), which are close together in the constellation Perseus. Both visible to the naked eye, NGC 869 and NGC 884 lie at a distance of about 7,500 light-years (2,300 pc) in the Perseus Arm of the Milky Way galaxy.

== Membership ==
NGC 869 has a mass of 4,700 solar masses and NGC 884 weighs in at 3,700 solar masses; both clusters are surrounded with a very extensive halo of stars, with a total mass for the complex of at least 20,000 solar masses. They form the core of the Perseus OB1 association of young hot stars.

Based on their individual stars, the clusters are relatively young, both 14 million years old. In comparison, the Pleiades have an estimated age ranging from 75 million years to 150 million years.

There are more than 300 blue-white supergiant stars in each of the clusters. The clusters are also blueshifted, with NGC 869 approaching Earth at a speed of 39 km/s (24 mi/s) and NGC 884 approaching at a similar speed of 38 km/s (24 mi/s). Their hottest main sequence stars are of spectral type B0. NGC 884 includes five prominent red supergiant stars, all variable and all around 8th magnitude: RS Persei, AD Persei, FZ Persei, V403 Persei, and V439 Persei.

== History ==
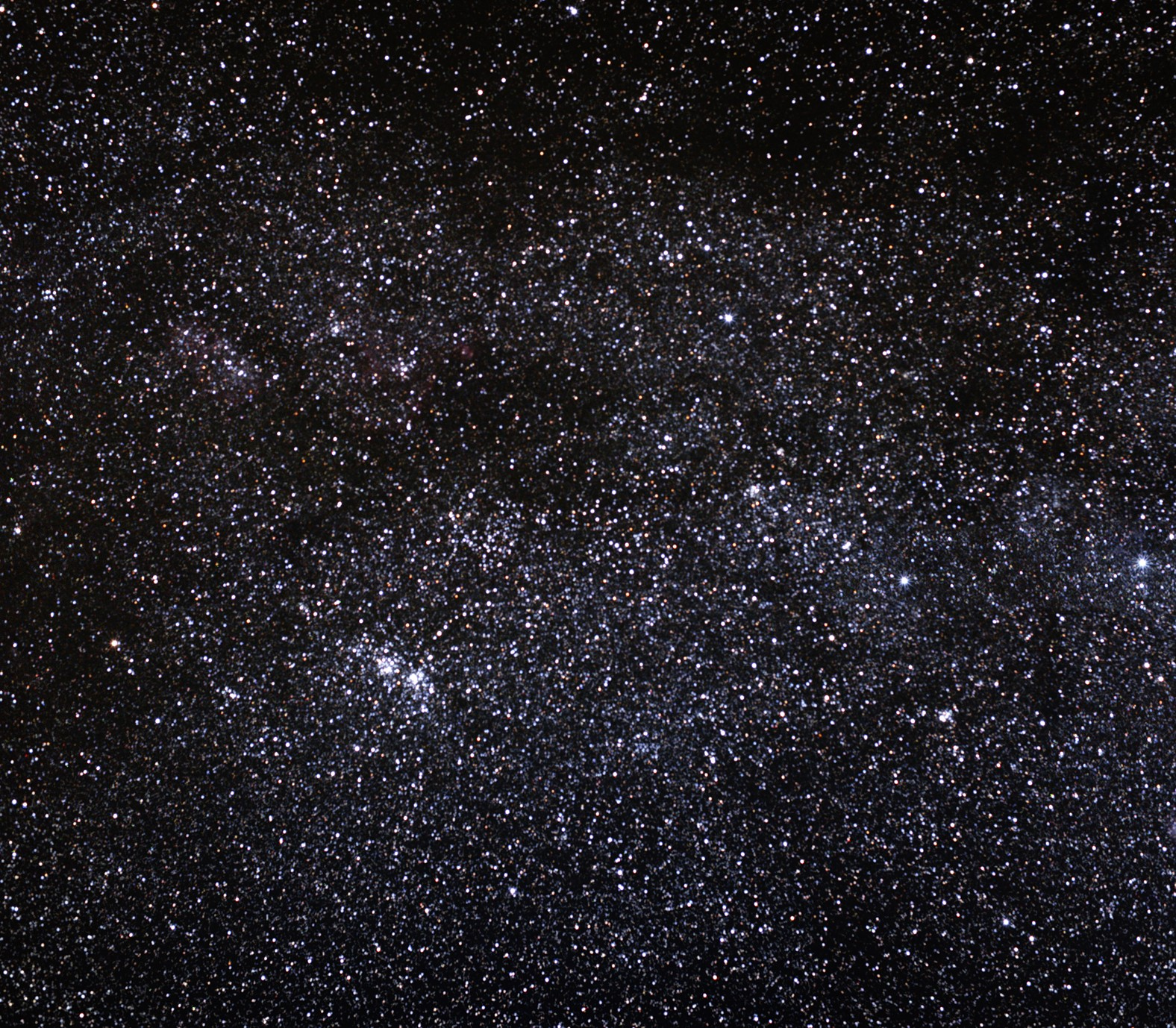
The Double Cluster in Perseus (lower left of center, wide angle view)

Greek astronomer Hipparchus cataloged the object (a patch of light in Perseus) as early as 130 BCE. To Bedouin Arabs the cluster marked the tail of the smaller of two fish they visualized in this area, and it was shown on illustrations in Abd al-Rahman al-Sufi's Book of Fixed Stars. However, the true nature of the Double Cluster was not discovered until the invention of the telescope, many centuries later. In the early 19th century William Herschel was the first to recognize the object as two separate clusters. The Double Cluster is not included in Messier's catalog, but is included in the Caldwell catalogue of popular deep-sky objects.

The clusters were designated h Persei and χ Persei by Johann Bayer in his Uranometria (1603). It is sometimes claimed that Bayer did not resolve the pair into two patches of nebulosity, and that χ refers to the Double Cluster and h to a nearby star. Bayer's Uranometria chart for Perseus does not show them as nebulous objects, but his chart for Cassiopeia does, and they are described as Nebulosa Duplex in Schiller's Coelum Stellatum Christianum, which was assembled with Bayer's help.

== Location ==
The Double Cluster is circumpolar (continuously above the horizon) from most northern temperate latitudes. It is in proximity to the constellation Cassiopeia. This northern location renders this object invisible from locations south of about 30º south latitude, such as New Zealand, most of Australia and South Africa. The Double Cluster is approximately the radiant of the Perseid meteor shower, which peaks annually around August 12 or 13. Although easy to locate in the northern sky, observing the Double Cluster in its two parts requires optical aid. They are described as being an "awe-inspiring" and "breathtaking" sight, and are often cited as a target in astronomy observer's guides.

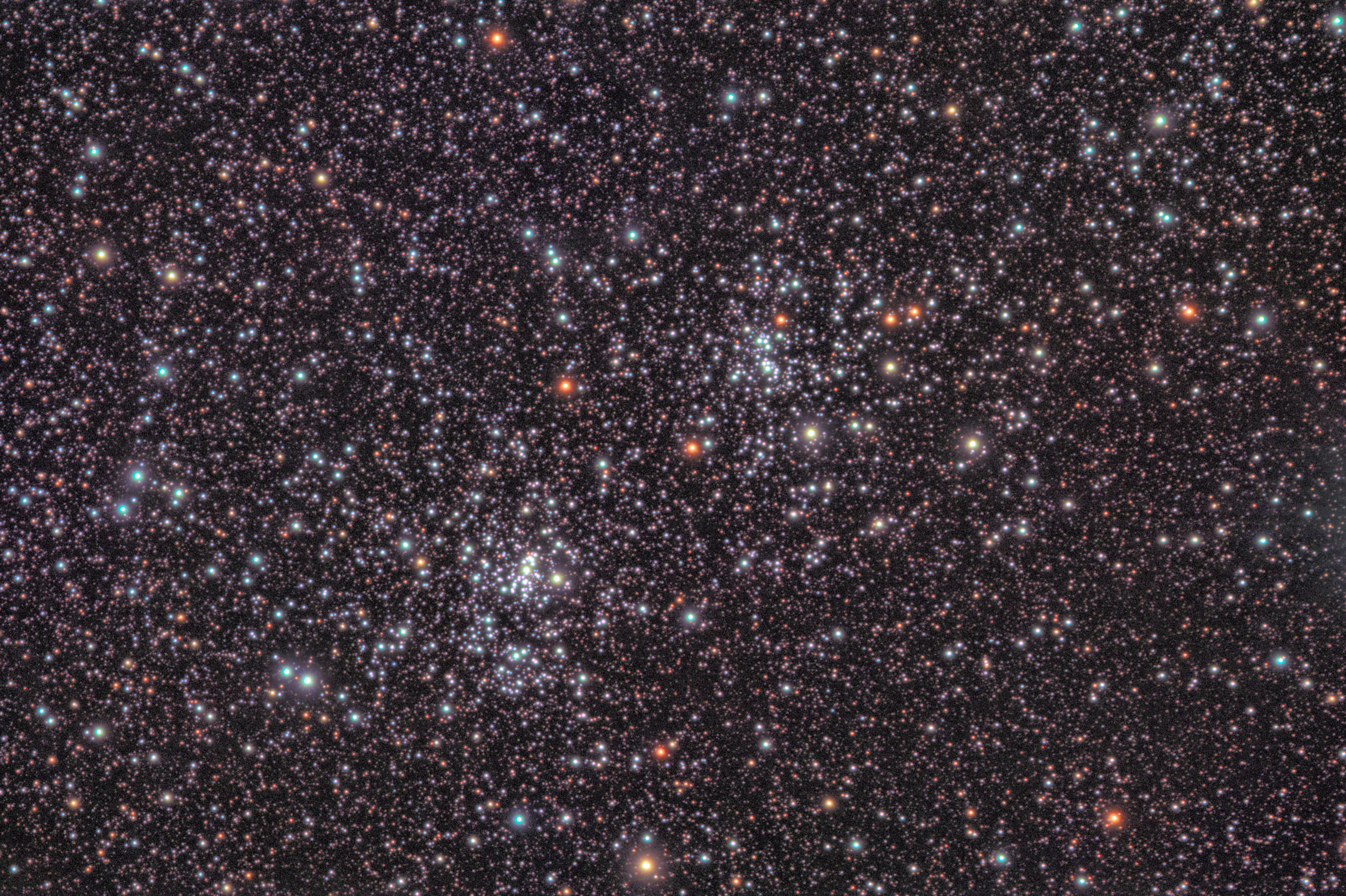
The Double Cluster in Perseus, visible light.

== Mythology ==
Perseus was a famous hero of Greek mythology, a son of the Greek god Zeus. Along with beheading Medusa, Perseus performed other heroic deeds such as saving princess Andromeda who was chained to a rock as a sacrifice to a sea monster, Cetus. The gods commemorated Perseus by placing him among the stars, with the head of Medusa in one hand and the jeweled sword in the other. The Double Cluster represents the jeweled handle of his sword.
