= Alpha Persei Cluster =

Open cluster in the constellation Perseus

- Image of Alpha Persei Cluster, Alpha Persei is the bright star on the left side of the image

Observation data (2000.0 epoch)
- Right ascension: 03^{h} 26^{m} 42.0^{s}
- Declination: +48° 48′ 00″
- Distance: 570 ly (175 pc)
- Apparent magnitude (V): 1.2
- Apparent dimensions (V): 6.1°

Physical characteristics
- Estimated age: 49.5±6.0 Myr
- Other designations: Per OB3, Cr 39, Mel 20, OCl 392.0

Associations
- Constellation: Perseus

The Alpha Persei Cluster, also known as Melotte 20, Collinder 39, or the Little Cloud of Pirates, is an open cluster of stars in the northern constellation of Perseus. To the naked eye, the cluster consists of several blue-hued spectral type B stars. The most luminous member is the ~2nd magnitude yellow supergiant Mirfak, also known as Alpha Persei. Bright members also include Delta, Sigma, Psi, 29, 30, 34, and 48 Persei. The Hipparcos satellite and infrared color-magnitude diagram fitting have been used to establish a distance to the cluster of ~560 light-years (172 pc). The distance established via the independent analyses agree, thereby making the cluster an important rung on the cosmic distance ladder. As seen from the Earth, the extinction of the cluster due to interstellar dust is around 0.30 magnitudes.

== Description ==
The cluster is centered to the northeast of Alpha Persei. It has a core radius of 11.4 ± 1.4 ly, a half-mass radius of 18 ly, and a tidal radius of 70.6 ± 8.5 ly, with 517 members being identified within the latter. The cluster shows solid evidence of having undergone mass segregation, with the mean stellar mass decreasing toward the edge. The age of this cluster is about 50–70 million years. Cluster member stars show a near-solar metallicity, meaning the abundance of elements with atomic numbers higher than 2 are similar to those in the Sun. The cluster shows evidence of tidal tails, which are most likely of galactic origin.

The cluster field displays evidence of a much larger, background star stream. This feature is quite a bit older than the cluster, with an estimated age of 5 ± 1 Gyr. The center of the stream lies 290 ly from the cluster and it has an overall thickness of 590 ly along the line of sight. This is most likely the remains of an old, massive cluster that now has a combined mass of ~6,000 M_{☉}.

== Members ==
The following prominent stars are considered members of the cluster with high likelihood:

Designation	Spectral type	Visual magnitude
α Per (33 Per)	F5Ib	1.81
δ Per (39 Per)	B5III	3.01
ε Per (45 Per)	B1V	2.88
ψ Per	B5Ve	4.31
HD 21278	B5V	4.99
31 Per	B5V	5.05
29 Per	B3V	5.16
30 Per	B8V	5.49
34 Per	B3V	4.67
48 Per	B3Ve	4.03
HD 21699	B8 III	5.49
HD 21071	B7V	6.09

A fainter, Sun-like star, TOI-6109, is known to host two Neptune-sized exoplanets.

== See also ==
- Coma Star Cluster
