= Psi Persei =

Star in the constellation Perseus

ψ Persei
- Location of ψ Persei (circled)

Observation data Epoch J2000 Equinox ICRS
- Constellation: Perseus
- Right ascension: 03^{h} 36^{m} 29.37982^{s}
- Declination: +48° 11′ 33.4789″
- Apparent magnitude (V): 4.17 - 4.28

Characteristics
- Spectral type: B5Ve
- U−B color index: −0.56
- B−V color index: −0.06
- Variable type: γ Cas

Astrometry
Radial velocity (R_{v})	−1.1 km/s
Proper motion (μ)	RA: +22.55 mas/yr Dec.: −27.78 mas/yr
Parallax (π)	5.59±0.22 mas
Distance	580 ± 20 ly (179 ± 7 pc)
Absolute magnitude (M_{V})	−2.03

Details
Mass	4.8 M_{☉}
Radius	5.5/7.26 R_{☉}
Luminosity	2,042 L_{☉}
Surface gravity (log g)	3.65 cgs
Temperature	15,654 K
Rotational velocity (v sin i)	275 km/s
Age	63.1 Myr

Other designations
- ψ Persei, ψ Per, Psi Per, 37 Persei, BD+47°857, GC 4287, HD 22192, HIP 16826, HR 1087, PPM 46127, SAO 46366

Database references
SIMBAD	data

Psi Persei (Psi Per, ψ Persei, ψ Per) is a single Be star in the northern constellation of Perseus. It has an apparent visual magnitude of about 4.2, so it is visible to the naked eye at night under suitably dark skies. Based on parallax measurements, it is located at a distance of roughly 580 light-years (180 parsecs) from the Earth.

== Properties ==
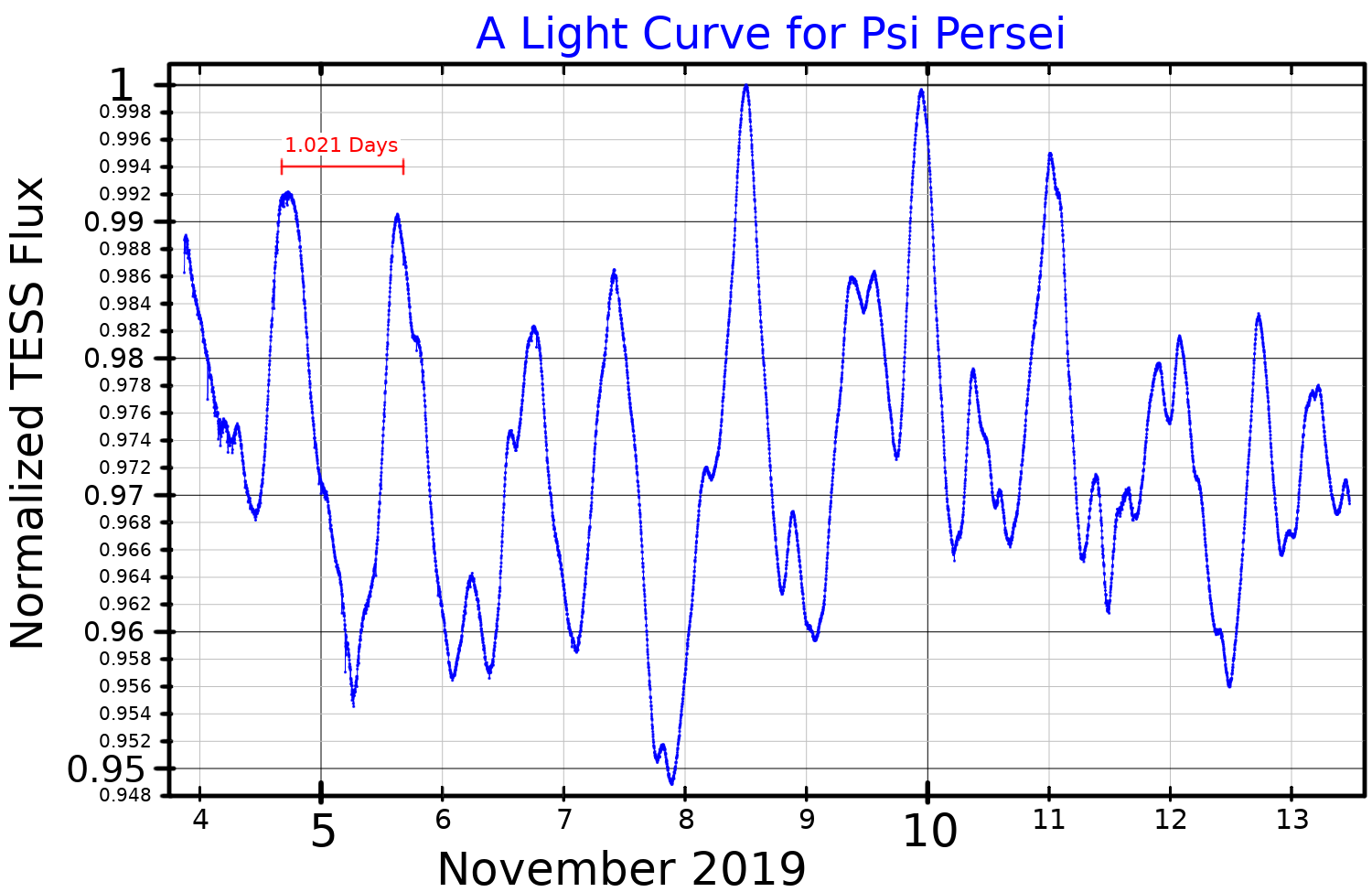
A light curve for Psi Persei, plotted from TESS data, with the period derived by Percy et al. shown in red.

This star has a stellar classification of B5Ve, which indicates it is a B-type main sequence star that is generating energy at its core through the nuclear fusion of hydrogen. It is a shell star with a circumstellar disc of gas surrounding the equator and extending out to about 11 times the radius of the star. As a result of this disc, the spectrum of this star shows emission lines (as indicated by the 'e' in the stellar class) and its magnitude varies over a period 1.021 days. The General Catalog of Variable Stars classifies Psi Persei as a gamma Cassiopeiae variable star, whose visual band brightness varies from magnitude 4.17 to 4.28.

Psi Persei is rotating rapidly with a projected rotational velocity (v sin i) along the equator of 390 km/s or more. The axis of rotation is inclined about 75° ± 8° to the line of sight from the Earth, so this velocity is close to the actual azimuthal velocity along the star's equator. It is expelling mass at the rate of about 5.0 × 10^{−8} times the mass of the Sun per year, or the equivalent of the Sun's mass every 20 million years. The rapid rotation causes Psi Persei to be an oblate shape, with the equatorial radius being 7.3 R_{☉} and the polar radius to be 5.5 R_{☉}.

This star may be a member of the Alpha Persei Cluster, although its proper motion is high compared to other members. Membership probabilities of 26% and 50% have been published from GALAH plus APOGEE data and from Gaia Data Release 2 data respectively.

== Name and etymology ==
This star, together with δ Per, σ Per, α Per, γ Per and η Per, has been called the Segment of Perseus.

In Chinese, 天船 (Tiān Chuán), meaning Celestial Boat, refers to an asterism consisting of ψ Persei, η Persei, α Persei, γ Persei, δ Persei, 48 Persei, μ Persei and HD 27084. Consequently, the Chinese name for ψ Persei itself is 天船四 (Tiān Chuán sì, English: the Fourth Star of Celestial Boat.)
