= Eta Persei =

Star system in the constellation Perseus

η Persei
- Location of η Per (circled)

Observation data Epoch J2000 Equinox ICRS
- Constellation: Perseus
- Right ascension: 02^{h} 50^{m} 41.810^{s}
- Declination: +55° 53′ 43.80″
- Apparent magnitude (V): 3.79

Characteristics
- Evolutionary stage: Red supergiant
- Spectral type: K3 Ib
- U−B color index: +1.90
- B−V color index: +1.69

Astrometry
Radial velocity (R_{v})	−1.07±0.27 km/s
Proper motion (μ)	RA: +16.346 mas/yr Dec.: −13.518 mas/yr
Parallax (π)	3.2657±0.1873 mas
Distance	1,000 ± 60 ly (310 ± 20 pc)
Absolute magnitude (M_{V})	−4.29

Details
Mass	8±0.4 M_{☉}
Radius	173.1+9.69 −10.8 R_{☉}
Luminosity	7,508±864 L_{☉}
Surface gravity (log g)	0.26 cgs
Temperature	4082±30 K
Rotational velocity (v sin i)	5.8 km/s
Age	37.8±6.2 Myr

Other designations
- Miram, η Persei, η Per, Eta Per, 15 Persei, BD+55 714, CCDM J02506+5553A, FK5 99, GC 3390, HD 17506, HIP 13268, HR 834, IDS 02434+5529 A, PPM 28039, SAO 23655, WDS J02507+5554A

Database references
SIMBAD	data

Eta Persei (η Persei, abbreviated Eta Per, η Per), is a red supergiant in the constellation of Perseus. Parallax measurements by the Gaia spacecraft imply that it is 1,000 is light-years away from Earth. At such distance, interstellar dust diminishes its apparent brightness by 0.47 magnitudes.

The two components of Eta Persei itself are designated Eta Persei A (officially named Miram /ˈmaɪræm/, a recent name for the system) and B.

== Nomenclature ==
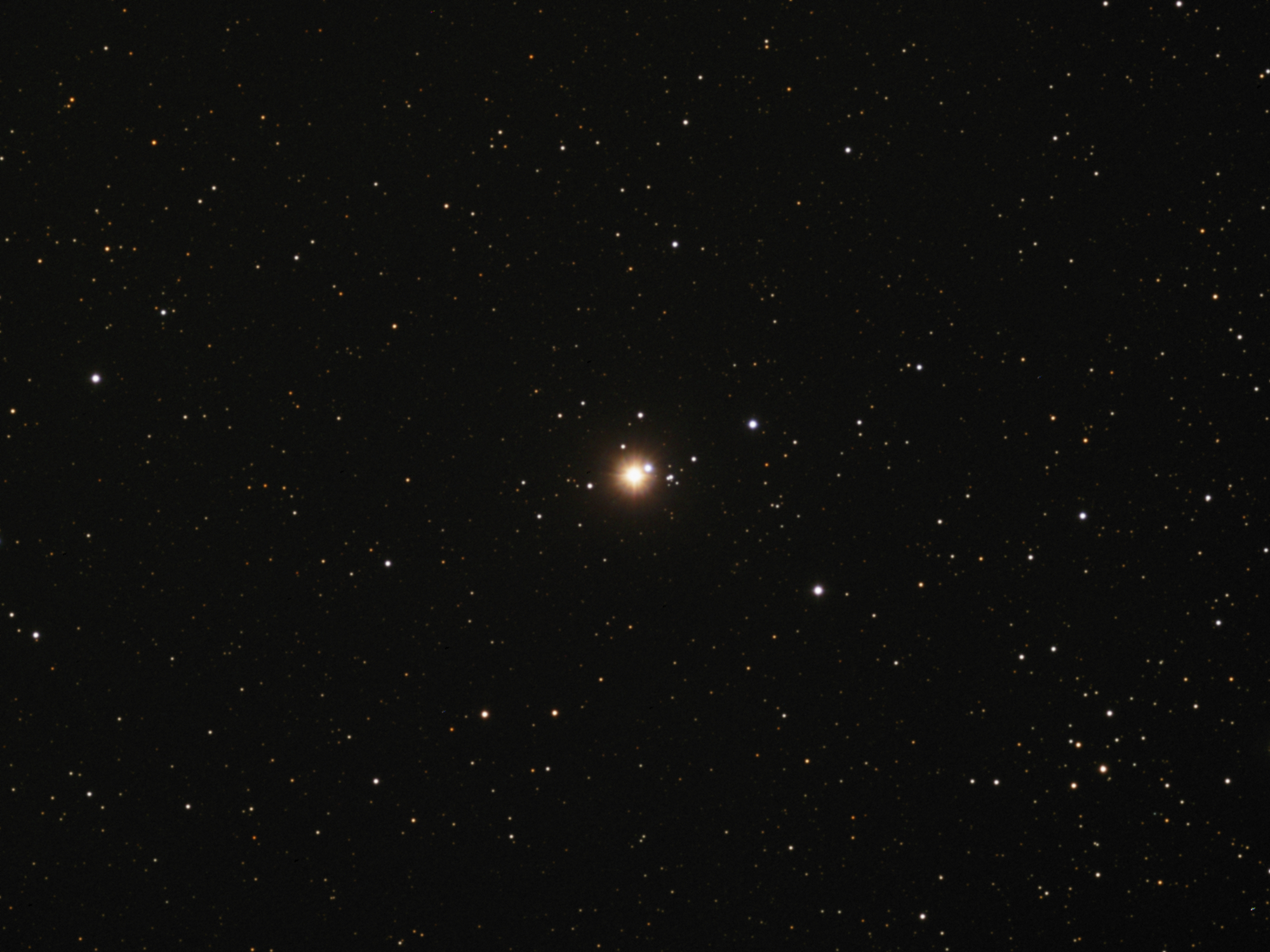
η Persei in optical light

η Persei (Latinised to Eta Persei) is the binary star's Bayer designation. The designations of its two components as Eta Persei A and B derive from the convention used by the Washington Multiplicity Catalog (WMC) for multiple star systems, and adopted by the International Astronomical Union (IAU).

Eta Persei mysteriously gained the named Miram in the 20th Century, though no source is known. In 2016, the IAU organized a Working Group on Star Names (WGSN) to catalog and standardize proper names for stars. The WGSN decided to attribute proper names to individual stars rather than entire multiple systems. It approved the name Miram for the component Eta Persei A on 5 September 2017 and it is now so included in the List of IAU-approved Star Names.

This star, together with Delta Persei, Psi Persei, Sigma Persei, Alpha Persei and Gamma Persei has been called the Segment of Perseus.

In Chinese, 天船 (Tiān Chuán), meaning Celestial Boat, refers to an asterism consisting of Eta Persei, Gamma Persei, Alpha Persei, Psi Persei, Delta Persei, 48 Persei, Mu Persei and HD 27084. Consequently, the Chinese name for Eta Persei itself is 天船一 (Tiān Chuán yī, English: the First Star of Celestial Boat.)

== Properties ==
The primary star (η Persei A) has a spectral classification of K3 Ib, meaning that it is a lower luminosity red supergiant star. It has expanded to 170 times the Sun's size and currently is emitting 7,500 times its luminosity. Its surface has an effective temperature of 4,082 K, which is cooler than the Sun and gives it an orange hue, typical of K-type stars.

Multiple star catalogues list a number of companions to Eta Persei, but it is unclear if any are physically related. The brightest close companion is 8th-magnitude HD 237009 28″ away, with 9th-magnitude HD 17456 4′ away. Of the six companions listed in the Washington Double Star Catalogue, only HD 237009 has a similar parallax to Eta Persei.
