= Mu Persei =

Star in the constellation Perseus

- Location of μ Persei (circled)

Observation data Epoch J2000 Equinox ICRS
- Constellation: Perseus
- Right ascension: 04^{h} 14^{m} 53.86253^{s}
- Declination: +48° 24′ 33.5912″
- Apparent magnitude (V): +4.16

Characteristics
- Spectral type: G0Ib + B9.5
- B−V color index: 0.935±0.002

Astrometry
Radial velocity (R_{v})	26.46 km/s
Proper motion (μ)	RA: 5.52 mas/yr Dec.: −17.37 mas/yr
Parallax (π)	3.62±0.20 mas
Distance	900 ± 50 ly (280 ± 20 pc)
Absolute magnitude (M_{V})	−3.11

Orbit
Period (P)	284 d
Semi-major axis (a)	18.8 ± 8.8 mas
Eccentricity (e)	0.062
Inclination (i)	74 ± 24°
Longitude of the node (Ω)	296 ± 18°
Periastron epoch (T)	2,420,062
Argument of periastron (ω) (secondary)	302°

Details
Mass	4.7 M_{☉}
Radius	42.9 R_{☉}
Luminosity	~2030 L_{☉}
Surface gravity (log g)	1.90 cgs
Temperature	5,412±23 K
Metallicity [Fe/H]	0.09 dex
Rotational velocity (v sin i)	12 km/s

Other designations
- Mu Per, μ Per, 51 Persei, NSV 1518, BD+48 1063, FK5 1117, GC 5099, HD 26630, HIP 19812, HR 1303, SAO 39404, PPM 46912, CCDM J04149+4824A, WDS J04149+4825A

Database references
SIMBAD	data

Mu Persei, Latinised from μ Persei, is a binary star system in the northern constellation of Perseus. It is visible to the naked eye as a point of light with a combined apparent visual magnitude of +4.16. The distance to this system is approximately 900 light-years based on parallax measurements. It is drifting further away with a radial velocity of +26 km/s.

Mu Persei is a spectroscopic binary with an orbital period of 284 days and an eccentricity of about 0.06. The primary component is a yellow G-type supergiant star, with an effective temperature of about 5,412 K, a radius of 42.9 solar radii, and a luminosity 2,030 times solar. The companion is a B-type star with a class of B9.5

Mu Persei is moving through the galaxy at a speed of 35.6 km/s relative to the Sun. Its projected galactic orbit carries it between 23,900 and 32,400 light-years from the center of the galaxy.

Mu Persei came closest to the Sun 5.6 million years ago when it had brightened to magnitude 3.25 from a distance of 600 light-years.

== Naming ==
In Chinese, 天船 (Tiān Chuán), meaning Celestial Boat, refers to an asterism consisting of μ Persei, η Persei, γ Persei, α Persei, ψ Persei, δ Persei, 48 Persei and HD 27084. Consequently, μ Persei itself is known as 天船七 (Tiān Chuán qī, English: the Seventh Star of Celestial Boat).
