= 29 Persei =

Star in the constellation Perseus

- Location of 29 Persei (circled)

Observation data Epoch J2000 Equinox ICRS
- Constellation: Perseus
- Right ascension: 03^{h} 18^{m} 37.74077^{s}
- Declination: +50° 13′ 19.8341″
- Apparent magnitude (V): 5.16

Characteristics
- Evolutionary stage: Main sequence
- Spectral type: B3V
- U−B color index: −0.56
- B−V color index: −0.06

Astrometry
Radial velocity (R_{v})	−1.50 km/s
Proper motion (μ)	RA: +23.574 mas/yr Dec.: −24.407 mas/yr
Parallax (π)	5.12±0.29 mas
Distance	640 ± 40 ly (200 ± 10 pc)
Absolute magnitude (M_{V})	−1.31

Details
Mass	6.8 M_{☉}
Radius	3.9 R_{☉}
Luminosity	960 L_{☉}
Surface gravity (log g)	4.025±0.113 cgs
Temperature	16,143 K
Metallicity [Fe/H]	0.00 dex
Rotational velocity (v sin i)	120 km/s

Other designations
- 29 Per, BD+49°899, FK5 2188, GC 3934, HD 20365, HIP 15404, HR 987, SAO 23944

Database references
SIMBAD	data

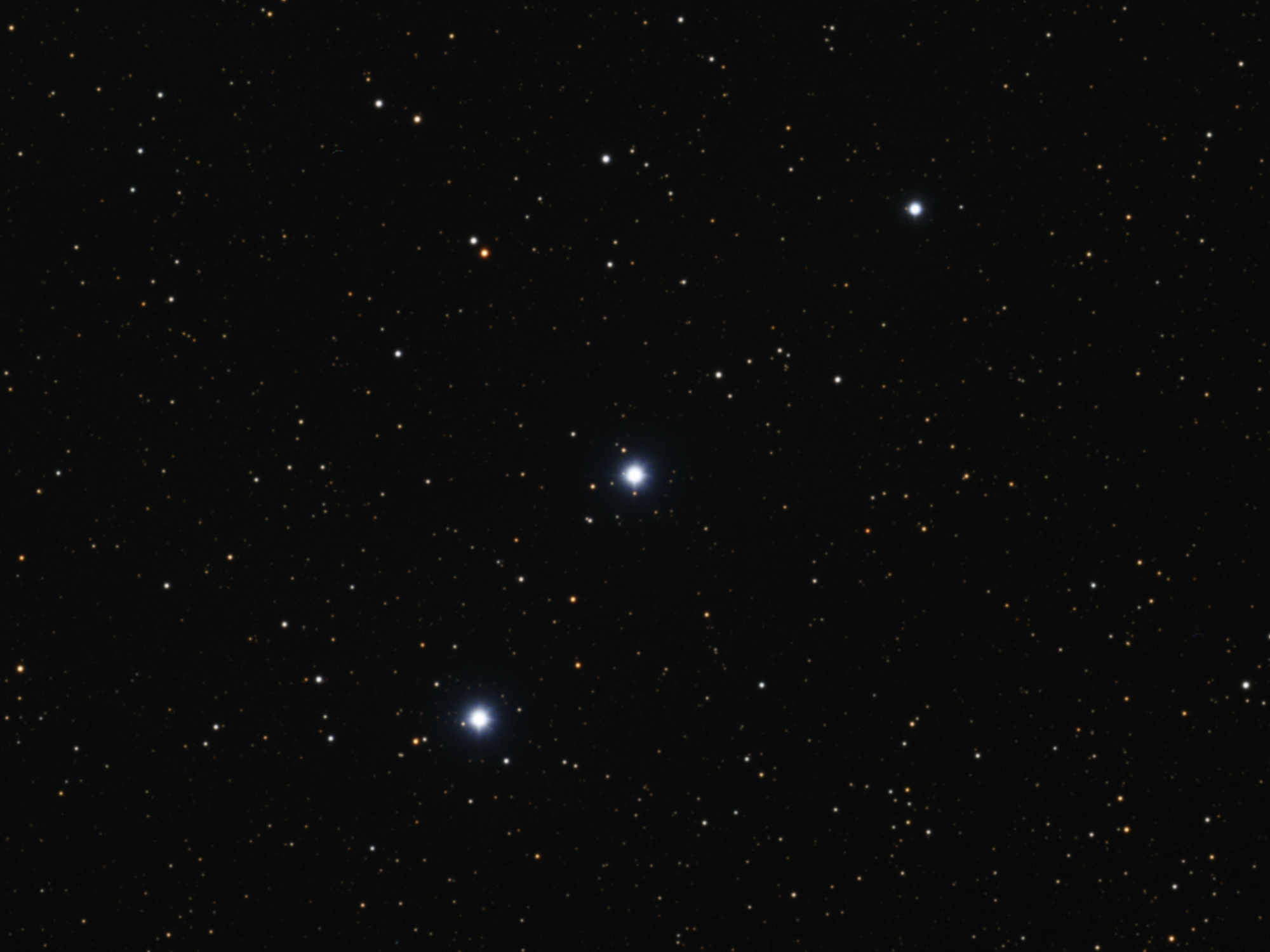
29 Persei is the bright star in the center of this optical light image. 31 Persei is the bright star lower and to the left of 29 Persei.

29 Persei is a single star in the northern constellation of Perseus, located approximately 640 light-years away from the Sun based on parallax. It is visible to the naked eye as faint, blue-white hued star with an apparent visual magnitude of 5.16. This object is a member of the Alpha Persei Cluster.

This is a B-type main-sequence star with a stellar classification of B3 V. During the 1930s it was reported to have a variable radial velocity, but that may instead have been due to instrument error. The star has a high rate of spin, showing a projected rotational velocity of 120 km/s. It has 6.8 times the mass of the Sun and about 3.9 times the Sun's radius. 29 Persei is radiating 960 times the Sun's luminosity from its photosphere at an effective temperature of 16,143 K.
