= Nu Persei =

Yellow-white hued star in the constellation Perseus

- Location of ν Persei (circled)

Observation data Epoch J2000 Equinox ICRS
- Constellation: Perseus
- Right ascension: 03^{h} 45^{m} 11.63204^{s}
- Declination: +42° 34′ 42.7829″
- Apparent magnitude (V): 3.80

Characteristics
- Spectral type: F5II
- U−B color index: +0.28
- B−V color index: +0.42
- Variable type: suspected

Astrometry
| Radial velocity (R_{v}) | −12.10 km/s |
| Proper motion (μ) | RA: −14.45 mas/yr Dec.: +2.53 mas/yr |
| Parallax (π) | 5.86±0.22 mas |
| Distance | 560 ± 20 ly (171 ± 6 pc) |
| Absolute magnitude (M_{V}) | −2.39 |

Details
| Mass | 5.01 M_{☉} |
| Radius | 20.62+1.72 −1.76 R_{☉} |
| Luminosity | 603.6±41.2 L_{☉} |
| Surface gravity (log g) | 3.04 cgs |
| Temperature | 6,300+287 −158 K |
| Metallicity [Fe/H] | +0.41 dex |
| Rotational velocity (v sin i) | 48.9 km/s |
| Age | 109 Myr |

Other designations
- ν Per, 41 Persei, NSV 1261, BD+42°815, FK5 134, GC 4474, HD 23230, HIP 17529, HR 1135, SAO 39078, CCDM J03452+4235A, WDS J03452+4235A

Database references
| SIMBAD | data |

ν Persei, Latinized as Nu Persei, is a single star and a suspected variable in the northern constellation of Perseus. It has a yellow-white hue and is visible to the naked eye with an apparent visual magnitude of 3.80. This object is located approximately 560 light-years from the Sun based on parallax but is drifting closer with a radial velocity of −12 km/s.

This object is a highly luminous bright giant star with a stellar classification of F5II. It has five times the mass of the Sun but has expanded to around 21 times the Sun's radius. The star has a relatively high rotation rate, spinning with a projected rotational velocity of 48.9 km/s. It is radiating 604 times the luminosity of the Sun from its enlarged photosphere at an effective temperature of 6,300 K.

Several visual companions beside the primary have been recorded. B, with magnitude 12.1 and separation 31.6", has its own companion, E, with magnitude 14.3 and separation 7.7". Additionally, C has magnitude 13.2 and separation 55.7", and D has magnitude 13.8 and separation 22.8".

In traditional Arab astronomy, δ, ν, and ε Persei formed al-ʿaḍud (العضد), "the upper arm" of al-Thurayya.
