= NGC 1220 =

Open cluster in Perseus

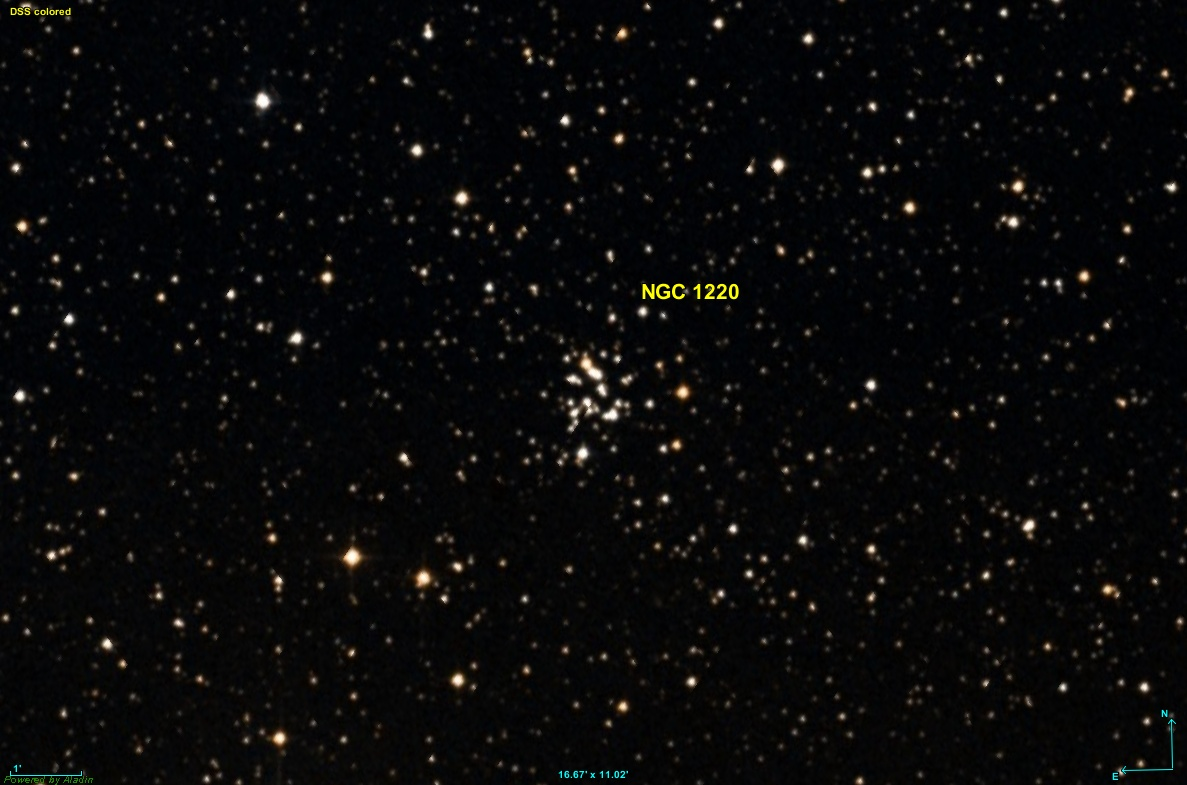
- NGC 1220 from the Digitized Sky Survey (DSS)

Observation data (J2000.0 epoch)
- Right ascension: 03^{h} 11^{m} 40^{s} (Note: Exact values for seconds vary from 40.0^{s} (Ortolani et al. (2002)) to 40.8^{s} (SIMBAD).)
- Declination: 53° 20′ 45″ (Note: Estimates for arcseconds vary from 38″ (SIMBAD) to 53.4″ (NED).)
- Distance: 5,900 light-years (1,800 pc)
- Apparent magnitude (V): 11.8
- Apparent dimensions (V): 2.6′

Physical characteristics
- Radius: 3.4 light-years (1.05 pc)
- Estimated age: 60 million years
- Other designations: Cr 37, OCL 380

Associations
- Constellation: Perseus

NGC 1220 is a young compact open cluster in the constellation Perseus. It was discovered by John Herschel in 1831.

The cluster is located at l = 143.04°, b = −3.96° in the galactic coordinate system, and is 120 parsecs above the galactic plane. It is approximately 6^{m} 42^{s} east and 10′ 12″ south from the nearest visible star, γ Persei.

NGC 1220 consists of approximately 26 stars with spectral types between A0 and B9, although the majority fall between A5 and B5.
