= Alpha Persei =

Brightest star in the constellation Perseus

α Persei
- Location of α Persei (circled)

Observation data Epoch J2000 Equinox ICRS
- Constellation: Perseus
- Right ascension: 03^{h} 24^{m} 19.37009^{s}
- Declination: +49° 51′ 40.2455″
- Apparent magnitude (V): 1.82

Characteristics
- Spectral type: F5 Ib
- U−B color index: +0.38
- B−V color index: +0.483

Astrometry
Radial velocity (R_{v})	−2.04 km/s
Proper motion (μ)	RA: +23.75 mas/yr Dec.: −26.23 mas/yr
Parallax (π)	6.44±0.17 mas
Distance	510 ± 10 ly (155 ± 4 pc)
Absolute magnitude (M_{V})	−5.1

Details
Mass	6–7 M_{☉}
Radius	53.8±1.4 R_{☉}
Luminosity	4,018±53 L_{☉}
Surface gravity (log g)	1.9±0.04 cgs
Temperature	6,439±80 K
Metallicity [Fe/H]	−0.159±0.016 dex
Rotation	50.75 or 90 days
Rotational velocity (v sin i)	19.0±0.2 km/s
Age	41 Myr

Other designations
- Mirfak, Mirphak, Marfak, Algeneb, Algenib, α Persei, α Per, Alpha Per, 33 Persei, BD+49 917, CCDM J03243+4951A, FK5 120, GC 4041, HD 20902, HIP 15863, HR 1017, IDS 03171+4930 A, PPM 46127, SAO 38787, WDS J03243+4952A

Database references
SIMBAD	data

Alpha Persei (Latinized from α Persei, abbreviated Alpha Per, α Per), formally named Mirfak (pronounced /ˈmɜːrfæk/ or /ˈmɪərfæk/), is the brightest star in the northern constellation of Perseus, outshining the constellation's best-known star, Algol (β Persei). Alpha Persei has an apparent visual magnitude of 1.8, and is a circumpolar star when viewed from mid-northern latitudes.

Alpha Persei lies in the midst of a cluster of stars named as the eponymous Alpha Persei Cluster, or Melotte 20, which is easily visible in binoculars and includes many of the fainter stars in the constellation. Determined distance using the trigonometric parallax, places the star 510 light-years (160 parsecs) away.

== Nomenclature ==
Alpha Persei is the brightest star in this image (left). This picture also shows the Alpha Persei Cluster

α Persei is the star's Bayer designation. The star also bore the traditional names Mirfak and Algenib, which are Arabic in origin. The former, meaning 'Elbow' and also written Mirphak, Marfak or Mirzac, comes from the Arabic Mirfaq al-Thurayya, while Algenib, also spelt Algeneb, Elgenab, Gęnib, Chenib or Alchemb, is derived from الجنب al-janb, or الجانب al-jānib, 'the flank' or 'side'. and was also the traditional name for Gamma Pegasi. In 2016, the International Astronomical Union organized a Working Group on Star Names (WGSN) to catalog and standardize proper names for stars. The WGSN's first bulletin of July 2016 included a table of the first two batches of names approved by the WGSN; which included Mirfak for this star (Gamma Pegasi was given the name Algenib).

Hinaliʻi is the name of the star in Native Hawaiian astronomy. The name of the star is meant to commemorate a great tsunami and mark the beginning of the migration of Maui. According to some Hawaiian folklore, Hinaliʻi is the point of separation between the Earth and the sky that happened during the creation of the Milky Way.

Assemani alluded to a title on the Borgian globe, Mughammid (مغمد), or Muliammir al Thurayya (ملىمرٱلطرى), the Concealer of the Pleiades, which, from its location, may be for this star.

This star, together with γ Persei, δ Persei, η Persei, σ Persei and ψ Persei, has been called the Segment of Perseus.

In Chinese, 天船 (Tiān Chuán), meaning Celestial Boat, refers to an asterism consisting of α Persei, γ Persei, δ Persei, η Persei, μ Persei, ψ Persei, 48 Persei and HD 27084. Consequently, the Chinese name for α Persei itself is 天船三 (Tiān Chuán sān, English: the Third Star of Celestial Boat).

== Physical properties ==
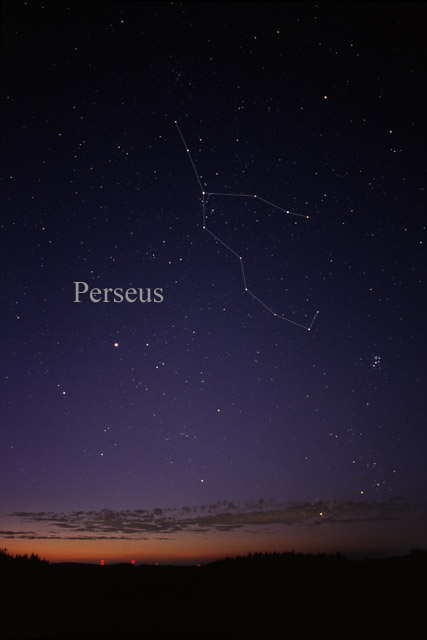
Mirfak is the brightest star in the constellation of Perseus (top center).

The spectrum of Alpha Persei matches a stellar classification of F5 Ib, revealing it to be a supergiant star in the latter stages of its evolution. It has a similar spectrum to Procyon A, though the latter star is much less luminous. This difference is highlighted in their spectral designation under the Yerkes spectral classification, published in 1943, where stars are ranked on luminosity as well as spectral typing. Procyon A is thus F5 IV, a subgiant star. Since 1943, the spectrum of Alpha Persei has served as one of the stable anchor points by which other stars are classified.

Alpha Persei has about 6 to 7 times the Sun's mass and has expanded to roughly 54 times the size of the Sun. It is radiating 4,020 times the luminosity of the Sun from its photosphere at an effective temperature of 6,439 K, which creates the yellow-white glow of an F-type star. The star has a weak magnetic field. Its rotation period may be either 50 or 90 days.

In the Hertzsprung–Russell diagram, Alpha Persei lies inside the region in which Cepheid variables are found. It is thus useful in the study of these stars, which are important standard candles. Despite Mirfak being not a Cepheid, Hipparcos photometry show a 0.006-magnitude variation with a period of 9.5 days.

== Search for planets ==
Alpha Persei has periodic radial velocity variations, with an amplitude of 70.8 ± 1.6 m/s. These variations are of uncertain origin; a 2012 study considered the possibility of them being caused by an orbiting exoplanet, estimated to have a minimum mass of approximately 6.6 times that of Jupiter and an orbital period of 128 days, but the claimed period may not be stable over 20 years so the exoplanet was considered doubtful. The authors suggested rotational modulation due to surface activity such as starspots as a more likely explanation of the radial velocity variations. In previous publications, periodic radial velocity variations of 87.7 or 77.7 days have been reported, but these have not been confirmed.

A further study, published in 2025, analysing radial velocity observations, found that the period of ~130 days weakened and disappeared during a time, while a 66-day period appeared. The hypothesis of a planet around Mirfak can now be discarded, considering the period changes over time. Variations with periods of 9.8 and 77.7 days, reported in previous studies, have not been detected. The most reasonable explanation to the radial velocity variations is stellar oscillations.
