= 34 Persei =

Binary star system in the constellation Perseus

- Location of 34 Persei (circled)

Observation data Epoch J2000 Equinox ICRS
- Constellation: Perseus
- Right ascension: 03^{h} 29^{m} 22.05019^{s}
- Declination: +49° 30′ 32.2114″
- Apparent magnitude (V): 4.67 (4.76 + 7.18)

Characteristics
- Evolutionary stage: Main sequence
- Spectral type: B3V
- U−B color index: −0.57
- B−V color index: −0.09

Astrometry
Radial velocity (R_{v})	−3.50 km/s
Proper motion (μ)	RA: +22.20 mas/yr Dec.: −29.49 mas/yr
Parallax (π)	6.05±0.36 mas
Distance	540 ± 30 ly (165 ± 10 pc)
Absolute magnitude (M_{V})	−1.62

Details

32 Per A
Mass	6.9±0.1 M_{☉}
Radius	3.1 R_{☉}
Luminosity	671 L_{☉}
Surface gravity (log g)	4.076 cgs
Temperature	16,421 K
Rotational velocity (v sin i)	200 km/s
Age	29.3±3.4 Myr

Other designations
- 34 Per, BD+49°945, FK5 1549, GC 4133, HD 21428, HIP 16244, HR 1044, SAO 38872, CCDM J03294+4931AB, WDS J03294+4931AB

Database references
SIMBAD	data

34 Persei is a binary star system in the northern constellation of Perseus. It is visible to the naked eye as a faint, blue-white hued point of light with a combined apparent visual magnitude of 4.67. The system is located approximately 540 light years away from the Sun based on parallax, but it is drifting closer with a radial velocity of −3.5 km/s. It is a likely member of the Alpha Persei Cluster.

The primary member, designated component A, is a B-type main-sequence star with a stellar classification of B3V and visual magnitude 4.76. It is an estimated 29 million years old with a high rate of spin, showing a projected rotational velocity of 200 km/s. The star has 6.9 times the mass of the Sun and about 3.1 times the Sun's radius. It is radiating 671 times the Sun's luminosity from its photosphere at an effective temperature of 16,421 K.

The secondary companion, component B, has an angular separation of 0.6″ from the primary and visual magnitude of 7.34.
