= HD 21278 =

Binary star system in the constellation Perseus

- Location of HD 21278 (circled)

Observation data Epoch J2000 Equinox ICRS
- Constellation: Perseus
- Right ascension: 03^{h} 28^{m} 03.07076^{s}
- Declination: +49° 03′ 46.3258″
- Apparent magnitude (V): 4.99

Characteristics
- Evolutionary stage: Main sequence
- Spectral type: B5V + B9V
- U−B color index: −0.56
- B−V color index: −0.10

Astrometry
Radial velocity (R_{v})	+1.20 km/s
Proper motion (μ)	RA: +22.754 mas/yr Dec.: −25.649 mas/yr
Parallax (π)	5.6775±0.1248 mas
Distance	570 ± 10 ly (176 ± 4 pc)
Absolute magnitude (M_{V})	−1.49

Orbit
Period (P)	21.685415±0.000035 days
Semi-major axis (a)	1.75820±0.00377 mas
Eccentricity (e)	0.13843±0.00010
Inclination (i)	148.938±0.030°
Longitude of the node (Ω)	85.725±0.049°
Periastron epoch (T)	mJD 46714.031±0.022
Argument of periastron (ω) (secondary)	89.946±0.049°
Semi-amplitude (K_{1}) (primary)	31.45±0.31 km/s
Semi-amplitude (K_{2}) (secondary)	50.47±0.31 km/s

Details

A
Mass	5.381±0.084 M_{☉}
Radius	3.75±0.09 R_{☉}
Luminosity	940 L_{☉}
Surface gravity (log g)	4.152±0.113 cgs
Temperature	16,750 K
Metallicity [Fe/H]	0.00 dex
Rotational velocity (v sin i)	53 km/s
Age	49.5±6.0 Myr

B
Mass	3.353±0.064 M_{☉}
Temperature	11,120 K
Age	49.5±6.0 Myr

Other designations
- BD+48°920, GC 4108, HD 21278, HIP 16147, HR 1034, SAO 38849

Database references
SIMBAD	data

HD 21278 is a binary star system in the constellation Perseus, located within the Alpha Persei Cluster. It has a blue-white hue and is visible to the naked eye with a combined apparent visual magnitude of 4.99. The system is located at a distance of approximately 570 light years from the Sun based on parallax, and it is drifting further away with a radial velocity of +1.20 km/s.

The binary nature of this star was announced in 1925 by Otto Struve. It is a double-lined spectroscopic binary with an orbital period of 21.685 days and an eccentricity of 0.138.

The primary component is a B-type main-sequence star with a stellar classification of B5V, indicating it is generating energy through core hydrogen fusion. The star is spinning with a projected rotational velocity of 53 km/s. It has 5.381 times the mass of the Sun and about 3.75 times the Sun's radius. HD 21278 A is radiating 940 times the luminosity of the Sun from its photosphere at an effective temperature of 16,410 K.

The secondary component is also a B-type main-sequence star, with a spectral class B9V. It has 3.353 times the mass of the Sun and an effective temperature of 11,120 K.
