= Delta Persei =

Star in the constellation Perseus

δ Persei
- Location of δ Persei (circled)

Observation data Epoch J2000 Equinox ICRS
- Constellation: Perseus
- Right ascension: 03^{h} 42^{m} 55.50426^{s}
- Declination: +47° 47′ 15.1746″
- Apparent magnitude (V): 3.01

Characteristics
- Spectral type: B5 III
- U−B color index: –0.51
- B−V color index: –0.12

Astrometry
Radial velocity (R_{v})	+4 km/s
Proper motion (μ)	RA: +25.58 mas/yr Dec.: −43.06 mas/yr
Parallax (π)	6.32±0.47 mas
Distance	520 ± 40 ly (160 ± 10 pc)

Details
Mass	7.0 ± 0.3 M_{☉}
Radius	10.4±0.6 (equatorial); 9.25±1.60 (polar) R_{☉}
Luminosity	2,860 L_{☉}
Surface gravity (log g)	3.5 cgs
Temperature	14,890 K
Rotational velocity (v sin i)	190 km/s
Age	50.1 ± 6.8 Myr

Other designations
- Sarvvis, δ Per, 39 Per, BD+47 876, FK5 131, GC 4427, HD 22928, HIP 17358, HR 1122, SAO 39053, PPM 46457, CCDM J03429+4748A, WDS J03429+4747A, IDS 03171+4930 A

Database references
SIMBAD	data

Delta Persei, also named Sarvvis, is a double star in the northern constellation of Perseus. It has an apparent visual magnitude of 3.01, making it readily visible with the naked eye. Parallax measurements give it a distance of about 520 light-years (160 parsecs) from the Earth.

== Name and etymology ==
Delta Persei (Latinized from δ Persei; abbreviated Delta Per, δ Per) is the star's Bayer designation. This star, together with ψ Per, σ Per, α Per, γ Per and η Per, has been called the Segment of Perseus.

In Chinese astronomy, 天船 (Tiān Chuán), meaning Celestial Boat, refers to an asterism consisting of δ Persei, η Persei, α Persei, γ Persei, ψ Persei, 48 Persei, μ Persei and HD 27084. Consequently, the Chinese name for δ Persei itself is 天船五 (Tiān Chuán wu, English: the Fifth Star of Celestial Boat).

In traditional Arab astronomy, δ, ν, and ε Persei formed al-ʿaḍud (العضد), "the upper arm" of al-Thurayya.

In Sámi culture, this star is part of Sarvvis (or Sarvva), the reindeer or moose, a large constellation in Cassiopeia, Perseus, and Auriga. Sarvvis is pursued by the hunter Fávdna, represented by the star Arcturus. The IAU Working Group on Star Names approved the name Sarvvis for Delta Persei A on 25 December 2025, after the Sámi constellation, and it is now so entered in the IAU Catalog of Star Names. ε Persei A was named Áldu, after the Sámi word for a female reindeer.

== Properties ==
The spectrum of this star matches a stellar classification of B5 III, which indicates it is a giant star that has evolved away from the main sequence after exhausting the hydrogen at its core. It has about seven times the Sun's mass and has an estimated age of 6.8 million years. The effective temperature of the outer envelope is 14,890 K, with the energy being emitted at this temperature giving it the blue-white hue that is a characteristic of a B-type star. It is rotating rapidly with a projected rotational velocity of 190 km s^{−1}, which gives a lower bound for the actual azimuthal velocity along the star's equator.

This is most probably a binary star and may be a triple star system. It has an optical companion with an apparent magnitude of +6.17 at an angular separation of 0.330 arcseconds and a position angle of 221°, but it is uncertain whether this is an optical double star or a gravitationally bound companion. The star has also been categorized as a spectroscopic binary, indicating that it has an orbiting companion that has not been separately resolved with a telescope. Finally, this star may be a member of the Melotte 20 open cluster, which would make it the second-brightest member after Mirfak.

Observation with the IRAS shows an extended, ring-like feature that may be a bow wave driven by radiation pressure from the star, rather than a bubble being generated by the stellar wind. This feature has an angular size of 15 × 25 arcminutes and a peak temperature of 38 K. It has an estimated peculiar velocity of more than 30 km s^{−1}, making it a runaway star.
