= 22 Scorpii =

Star in the constellation Scorpius

- Location of 22 Scorpii (circled in red)

Observation data Epoch J2000 Equinox ICRS
- Constellation: Scorpius
- Right ascension: 16^{h} 30^{m} 12.47527^{s}
- Declination: −25° 06′ 54.7966″
- Apparent magnitude (V): 4.78

Characteristics
- Evolutionary stage: main sequence
- Spectral type: B3 V

Astrometry
Proper motion (μ)	RA: −4.192 mas/yr Dec.: −26.975 mas/yr
Parallax (π)	7.9402±0.1848 mas
Distance	411 ± 10 ly (126 ± 3 pc)
Absolute magnitude (M_{V})	−0.72

Details
Mass	4.4 M_{☉}
Radius	3.4 R_{☉}
Luminosity	601 L_{☉}
Surface gravity (log g)	4.5 cgs
Temperature	16,683 K
Metallicity [Fe/H]	0.66 dex
Rotational velocity (v sin i)	169±4 km/s
Age	8 Myr

Other designations
- i Sco, 22 Sco, CD−24°12695, HD 148605, HIP 80815, HR 6141, SAO 184429

Database references
SIMBAD	data

22 Scorpii (i Scorpii) is a single star in the southern zodiac constellation of Scorpius, about one degree from Antares. It is faintly visible to the naked eye with an apparent visual magnitude of 4.78. The distance to this star is estimated to be around 411 light years, as derived from its annual parallax shift of 7.9±0.2 mas. The star is embedded in, or adjacent to, the diffuse nebulous cloud IC 4605 located in the western regions of the Rho Ophiuchi cloud complex.

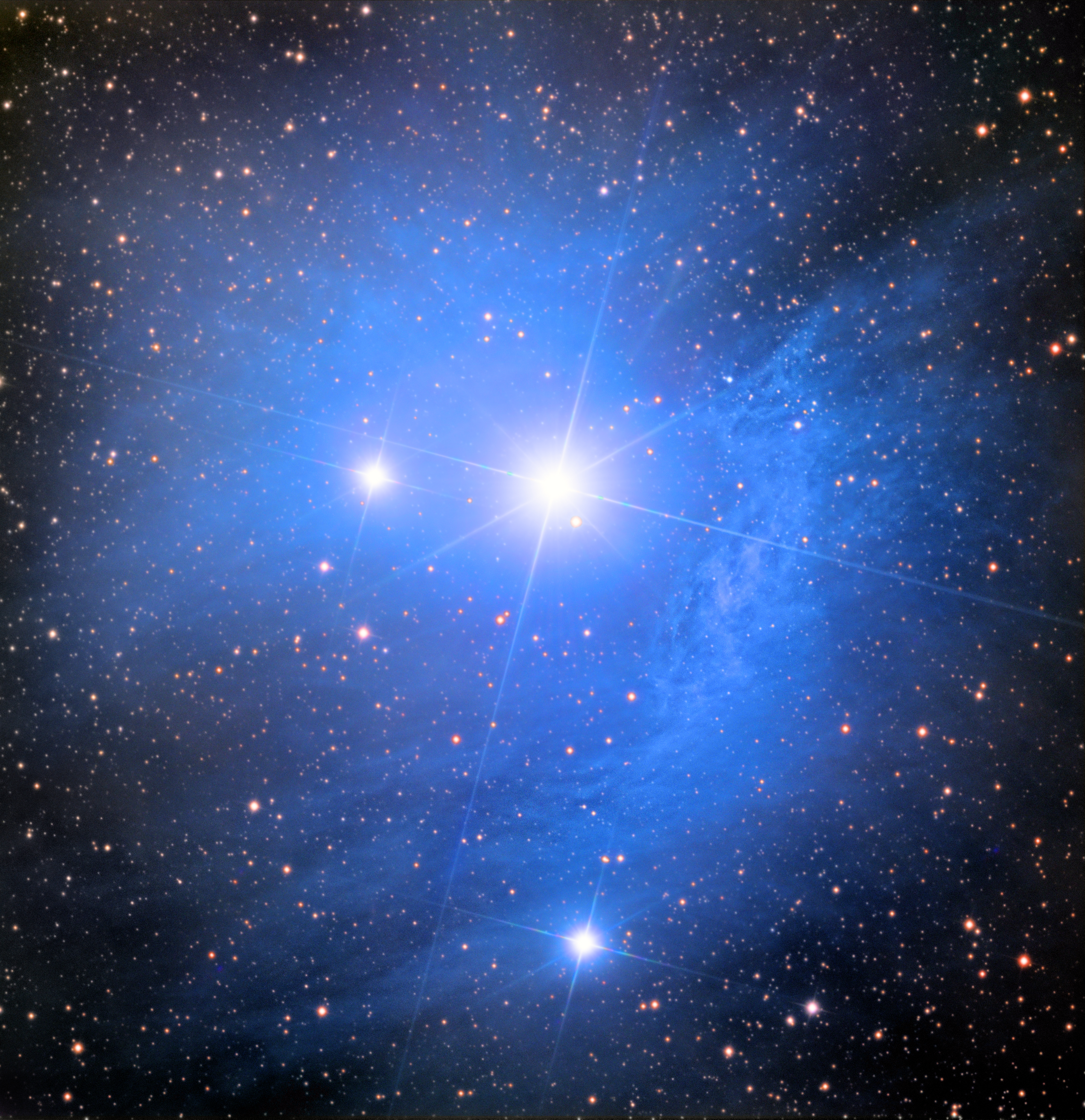
22 Scorpii in the IC 4605 reflection nebula, one of a collection of diffuse and dark nebulae in the Rho Ophiuchi cloud complex

22 Scorpii is a B-type main-sequence star with a stellar classification of B3 V. It is ten million years old and has a high rate of spin with a projected rotational velocity of 169 km/s. The star has about 4.4 times the mass of the Sun and is radiating 601 times the Sun's luminosity from its photosphere at an effective temperature of 16,683 K.
