= HD 21071 =

Star in the constellation Perseus

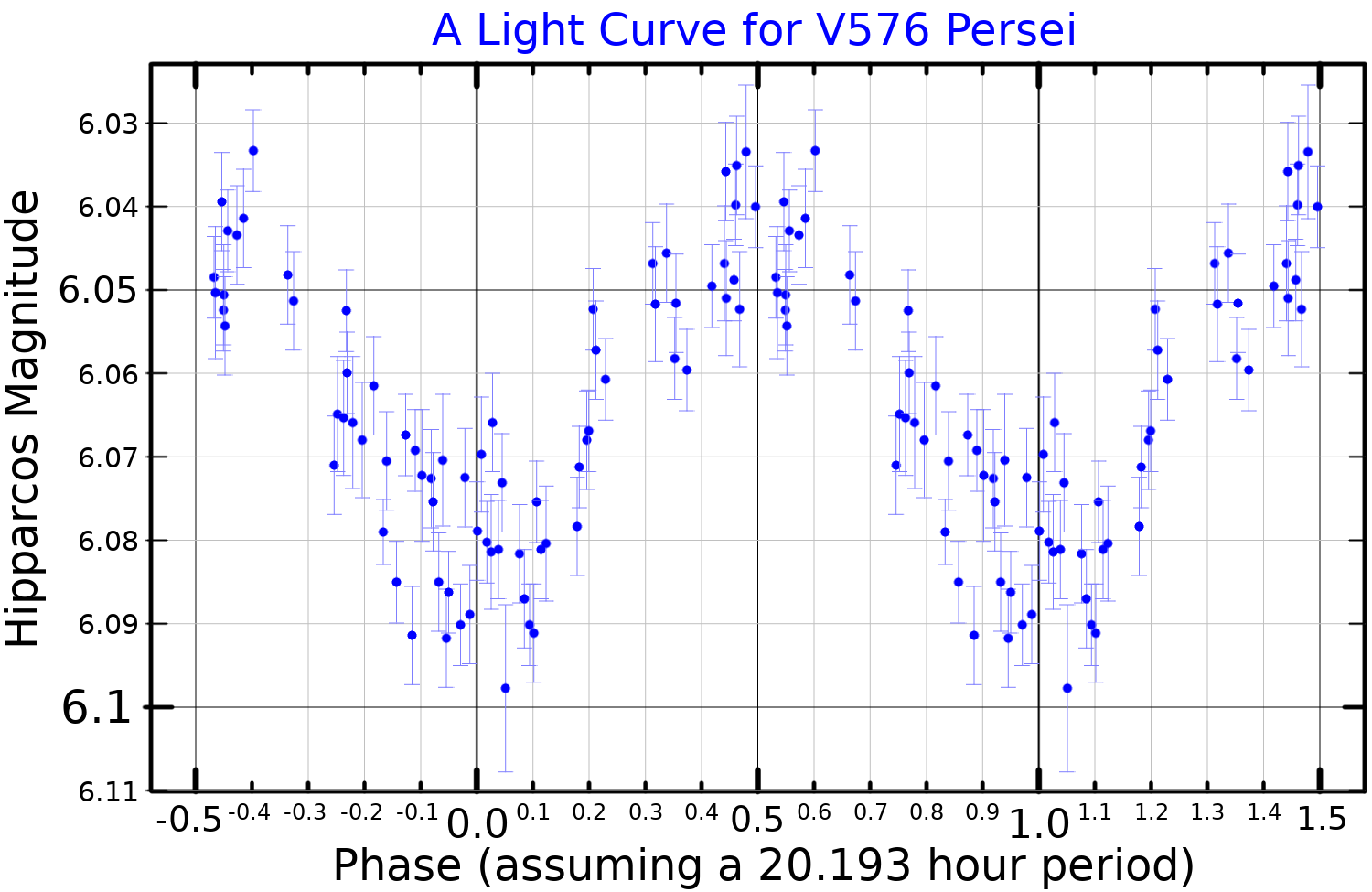
- A light curve for V576 Persei, plotted from Hipparcos data

Observation data Epoch J2000 Equinox ICRS
- Constellation: Perseus
- Right ascension: 03^{h} 25^{m} 57.382^{s}
- Declination: +49° 07′ 14.73″
- Apparent magnitude (V): 6.09

Characteristics
- Evolutionary stage: Main sequence
- Spectral type: B7 V
- B−V color index: −0.073±0.005
- Variable type: SPB

Astrometry
Radial velocity (R_{v})	−1.5±0.9 km/s
Proper motion (μ)	RA: +23.753 mas/yr Dec.: −26.656 mas/yr
Parallax (π)	6.0959±0.0444 mas
Distance	535 ± 4 ly (164 ± 1 pc)
Absolute magnitude (M_{V})	−0.19

Details
Mass	3.69+0.14 −0.15 M_{☉}
Radius	2.21 R_{☉}
Luminosity	278.0+53.1 −44.7 L_{☉}
Surface gravity (log g)	4.30 cgs
Temperature	14,768 K
Metallicity [Fe/H]	0.0082+0.0053 −0.0032 dex
Rotational velocity (v sin i)	58 km/s
Age	90 Myr

Other designations
- V576 Per, BD+48°913, GC 4075, HD 21071, HIP 15988, HR 1029, SAO 38817

Database references
SIMBAD	data

HD 21071 is a blue-white hued variable star in the northern constellation of Perseus. Also known as V576 Persei, it is a sixth magnitude star that is dimly visible to the naked eye under good viewing conditions, having an apparent visual magnitude of 6.09. The brightness of the star varies with a multiperiodic cycle. The distance to HD 21071, as determined from an annual parallax shift of 6.1 mas, is 535 light years. It is a member of the young Alpha Persei Cluster, Melotte 20, and moving is closer to the Earth with a heliocentric radial velocity of −1.5 km/s.

This is a B-type main-sequence star with a stellar classification of B7 V. HD 21071 belongs to an unusual stellar population termed 'sn' stars. These seem to be related to chemically peculiar stars, but have sharp ('s') Balmer and metal absorption lines with "broad coreless He I" ('n') lines. The latter wide, "nebulous" lines may be due to Stark broadening caused by an electric field. HD 21071 is a slowly pulsating B-type star (SPB star) that was initially found to vary with a period of 0.84 days. Further study revealed four frequencies, with the two dominant, higher amplitude frequencies having similar cycles of 1.19 and 1.15 per day.

Pulsation Periods
ID	Frequency (d^{−1})	V Amplitude (mmag)	Radial Velocity (km/s)
1	1.18843	18.5	3.28±0.85
2	1.14934	7.7	–
3	1.41968	3.8	–
4	0.95706	3.0	–

Stellar models show the star to have 3.7 times the mass of the Sun, with 2.21 times the Sun's radius. It is 90 million years old with a near-solar metallicity and is spinning with a projected rotational velocity of 58 km/s. The star is radiating 278 times the Sun's luminosity from its photosphere at an effective temperature of 14,768 K.
