= Gamma Persei =

Binary star system in the constellation Perseus

γ Persei
- Location of γ Persei (circled)

Observation data Epoch J2000.0 Equinox ICRS
- Constellation: Perseus
- Right ascension: 03^{h} 04^{m} 47.82011^{s}
- Declination: +53° 30′ 23.2626″
- Apparent magnitude (V): 2.93

Characteristics
- Evolutionary stage: Blue straggler + late main sequence/subgiant
- Spectral type: G8III + A2V
- U−B color index: +0.45
- B−V color index: +0.70
- Variable type: EA

Astrometry
Radial velocity (R_{v})	+2.5 km/s
Proper motion (μ)	RA: −14.194 mas/yr Dec.: −8.684 mas/yr
Parallax (π)	14.735±0.188 mas
Distance	221 ± 3 ly (67.9 ± 0.9 pc)
Absolute magnitude (M_{V})	–1.50 (–1.23/0.01)

Orbit
Period (P)	14.6 yr
Semi-major axis (a)	0.144″
Eccentricity (e)	0.785
Inclination (i)	90.9°
Longitude of the node (Ω)	244.1°
Periastron epoch (T)	1991.08 Besselian
Argument of periastron (ω) (secondary)	170.0°

Details

γ Per A
Mass	3.6±0.2 M_{☉}
Radius	22.7±1.14 R_{☉}
Luminosity	282 L_{☉}
Surface gravity (log g)	2.23±0.08 cgs
Temperature	4,970±70 K
Metallicity [Fe/H]	–0.19 dex
Rotation	5,350 days
Rotational velocity (v sin i)	50.0 km/s
Age	750–900 Myr

γ Per B
Mass	2.4±0.2 M_{☉}
Radius	3.9±0.2 R_{☉}
Luminosity	67.6 L_{☉}
Surface gravity (log g)	3.6±0.08 cgs
Temperature	8,400±70 K
Age	750–900 Myr

Other designations
- γ Persei, γ Per, Gamma Per, 23 Persei, BD+52 654, CCDM J03048+5331AP, FK5 108, GC 3664, HD 18925, HIP 14328, HR 915, IDS 02576+5307 AP, PPM 28201, SAO 23789, WDS J03048+5330Aa,Ab.

Database references
SIMBAD	data

Gamma Persei (Gamma Per, γ Persei, γ Per) is a binary star system in the constellation Perseus. The combined apparent visual magnitude of the pair is +2.9, making it the fourth-brightest member of the constellation. The distance to this system is of roughly 221 light-years (68 parsecs) with a 1% margin of error. About 4° to the north of Gamma Persei is the radiant point for the annual Perseid meteor shower.

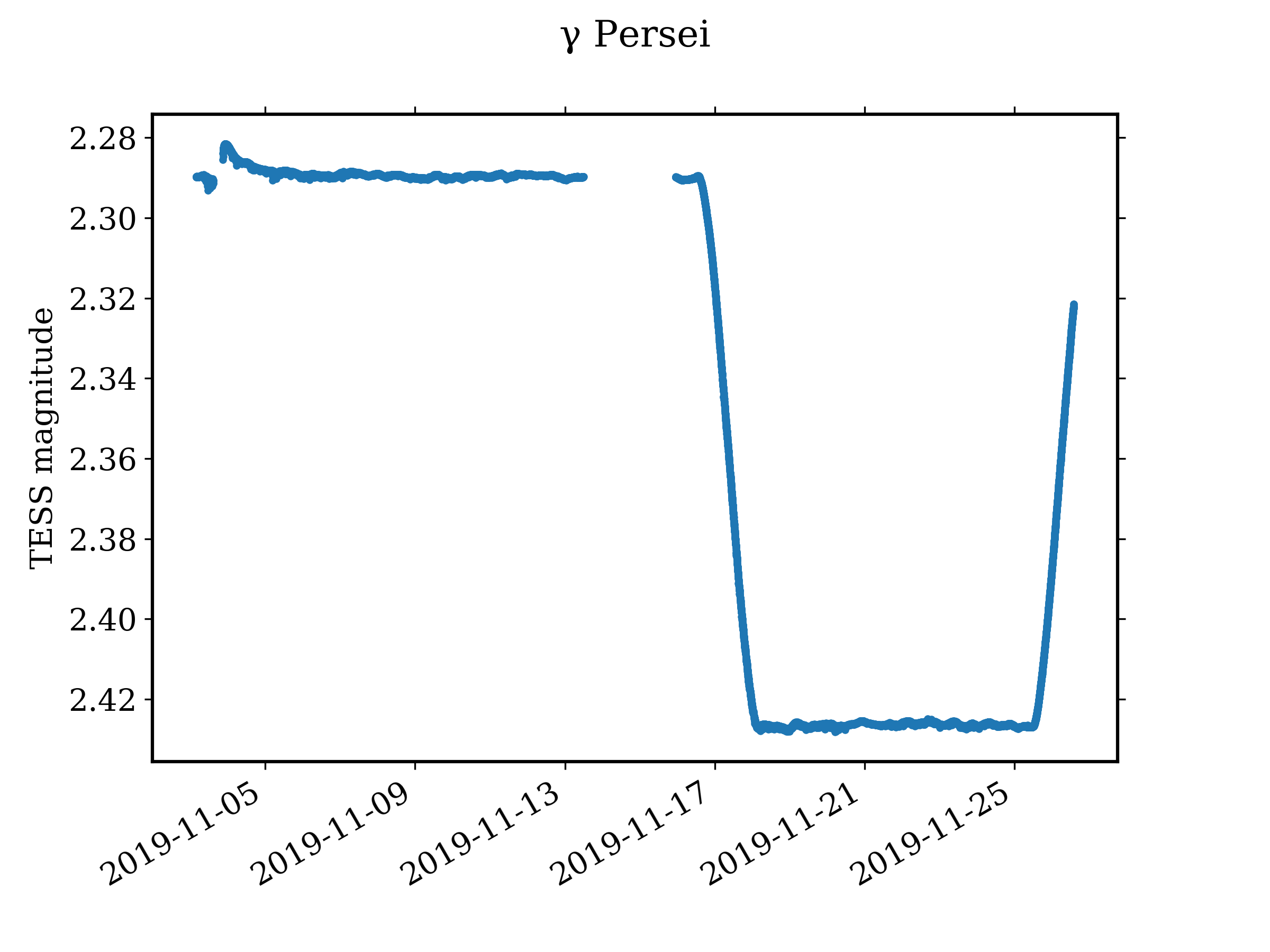
Lightcurve of Gamma Persei's 2019 eclipse recorded by NASA's Transiting Exoplanet Survey Satellite (TESS).

This is a wide eclipsing binary system with an orbital period of 5,329.8 days (14.6 years). This eclipse was first observed in 1990 and lasted for two weeks. During an eclipse, the primary passes in front of the secondary, causing the magnitude of the system to decrease by 0.55. The primary component of this system is a giant star with a stellar classification of G9 III. It has a projected rotational velocity of 50.0 km s^{−1} and a lengthy estimated rotation period of 14.6 years. The classification of the secondary remains tentative, with assignments of A3 V and A2(III). The secondary component appears to be much older than the primary, based on estimates derived by evolutionary tracks. Therefore, the primary is likely to be the product of a stellar merger, with the estimated age of the primary corresponding only to the time elapsed since the merger.

Mass estimates for the two stars remain disparate. Using speckle interferometry, McAlister (1982) obtained mass estimates of 4.73 solar masses (4.73 M_{☉}) for the primary and 2.75 M_{☉} for the secondary. He noted that the mass estimate was too high for the given classification of the primary. Martin and Mignard (1998) determined masses for both components based on data from the Hipparcos mission: 5.036 ± 0.951 M_{☉} for the primary and 2.295 ± 0.453 M_{☉} for the secondary. They admit that the high inclination of the orbit resulted in a large margin of error. Prieto and Lambert (1999) came up with a mass estimate of 3.81 M_{☉} for the primary, while Pizzolato and Maggio (2000) obtained 4.34 M_{☉}. Ling et al. (2001) obtained estimates of 2.7 M_{☉} for the primary and 1.65 M_{☉} for the secondary, while Kaler (2001) obtained 2.5 and 1.9, respectively. Diamant et al. (2023) found masses of 3.6 and 2.4 M_{☉} for A and B respectively.

== Name and etymology ==
- This star, together with δ Per, ψ Per, σ Per, α Per and η Per, has been called the Segment of Perseus.
- In Chinese, 天船 (Tiān Chuán), meaning Celestial Boat, refers to an asterism consisting of γ Persei, η Persei, α Persei, ψ Persei, δ Persei, 48 Persei, μ Persei and HD 27084. Consequently, the Chinese name for γ Persei itself is 天船二 (Tiān Chuán èr, English: the Second Star of Celestial Boat.)
