= HD 21699 =

Variable star in the constellation Perseus

- Location of HD 21699 (circled)

Observation data Epoch J2000.0 Equinox J2000.0
- Constellation: Perseus
- Right ascension: 03^{h} 32^{m} 08.60842^{s}
- Declination: +48° 01′ 24.5285″
- Apparent magnitude (V): 5.45 - 5.53

Characteristics
- Spectral type: B8 III
- U−B color index: −0.61
- B−V color index: −0.17
- Variable type: SX Arietis

Astrometry
Radial velocity (R_{v})	2.6±0.9 km/s
Proper motion (μ)	RA: 18.314±0.149 mas/yr Dec.: −28.723±0.144 mas/yr
Parallax (π)	5.6378±0.1539 mas
Distance	580 ± 20 ly (177 ± 5 pc)
Absolute magnitude (M_{V})	−0.982

Details
Mass	6.46 M_{☉}
Radius	3.55 R_{☉}
Luminosity	708 L_{☉}
Surface gravity (log g)	4.15 cgs
Temperature	16,000 K
Metallicity [Fe/H]	+0.92 dex
Rotation	2.49246±0.00035 d
Rotational velocity (v sin i)	35 km/s
Age	12±6 Myr

Other designations
- V396 Per, HR 1063, HIP 16470, SAO 38917

Database references
SIMBAD	data

HD 21699, also known as HR 1063 and V396 Persei, is a star about 580 light years from the Earth, in the constellation Perseus. It is a 5th magnitude star, so it will be faintly visible to the naked eye of an observer far from city lights. This is a variable star, whose brightness varies slightly from 5.45 to 5.53 during its 2.4761 day rotation period. It has a remarkable dipole magnetic field which is displaced from the star's center by 0.4 stellar radii, the poles of which appear close to each other on the stellar surface. HD 21699 is a member of the Alpha Persei Cluster.

== Properties ==
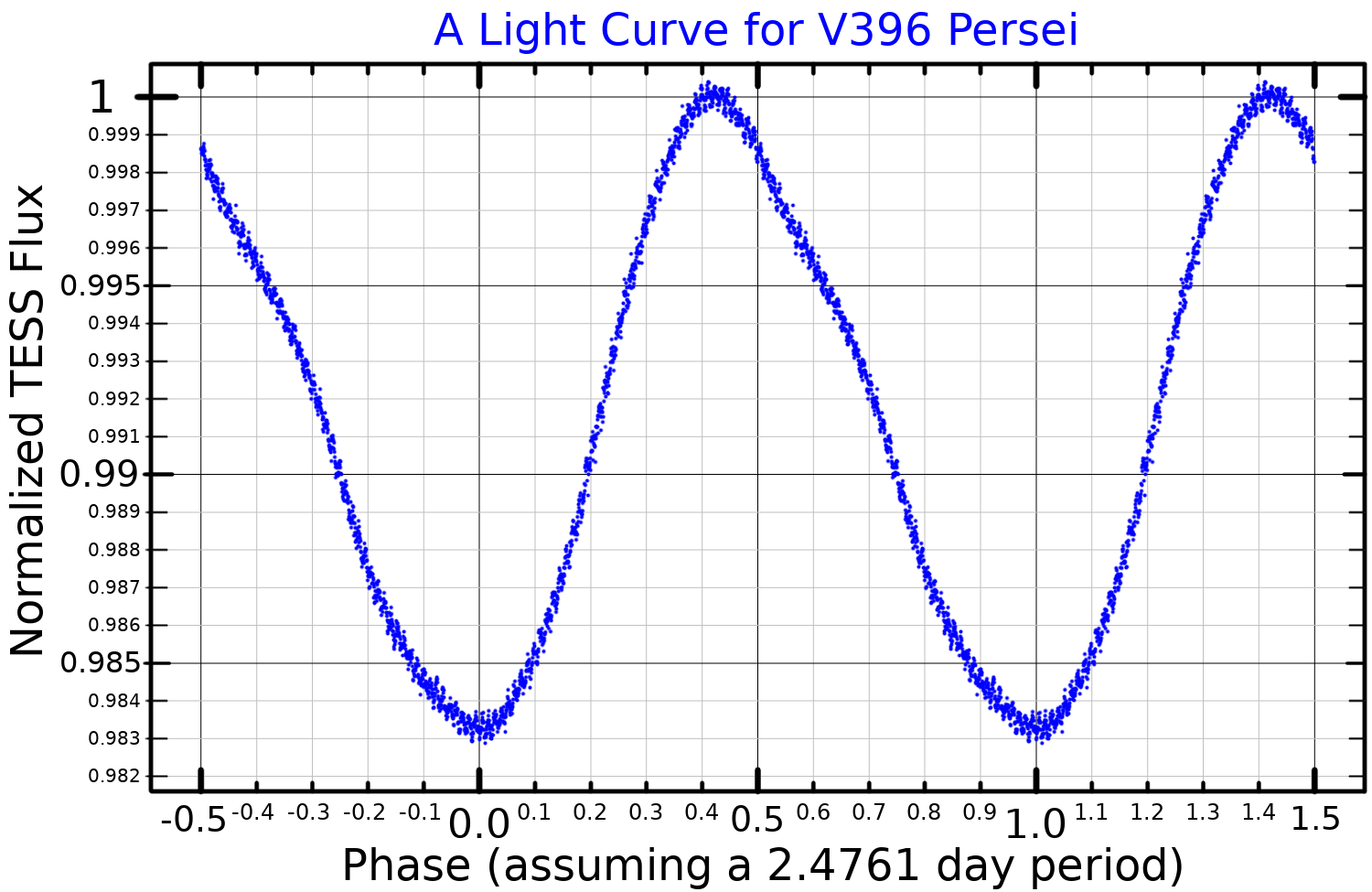
A light curve for V396 Persei, plotted from TESS data

In 1967, Robert Garrison noted that the U-B color of HD 21699 is significantly bluer (more negative) than the spectral type assigned to it (B8 III) would suggest. Such a discrepancy suggests that the star is helium-weak. The star's helium-weak nature was confirmed by William Morgan et al. in 1971. HD 21699 also has an enhanced silicon abundance.

John Winzer observed HD 21699 during 1971 - 1972 and discovered that it is a variable star. He found it varied by 0.03, 0.04 and 0.05 magnitudes in the visible, blue and ultraviolet photometric bands, respectively. Though he found that the brightness varied periodically, he was unable to unambiguously assign a period to it. It was the first helium-weak star to be found to vary in brightness periodically. In 1974, HD 21699 was assigned the variable star designation V396 Persei. In 1985, John Percy established that the star's variability period is 2.49246±0.00035 days.

== Magnetic field ==
In 1980, Werner Weiss deduced that HD 21699 has a magnetic field, based on a heuristic relationship between photometric colors and a star's surface magnetic field. In 1984, Douglas Brown et al. announced that a magnetic field with a strength of about one kilogauss had been detected from observations of Zeeman splitting of spectral lines. That same year, Brown et al. announced that International Ultraviolet Explorer data showed evidence of a stellar wind flowing from HD 21699, which was constrained to flow from the region of the star's magnetic poles. This "plume" of gas sweeps across the line of sight for an observer on the Earth, as the star rotates.

In 2007, Yu. V. Glagolevskij and G. A. Chuntonov examined the extensive data which had been collected for HD 21699, and concluded that the star has a very peculiar magnetic field. In their model, the field is a dipole, but it is displaced by 0.4±0.1 stellar radii from the star's center. If the dipole were centered within the star, one would expect that the surface magnetic poles would be separated by 180° along a great circle which contained both poles. However, because the dipole is displaced from the star's center, the poles are separated by only 55°. Furthermore, the two magnetic poles lie almost exactly on the star's equator. Their estimate for the field's strength is 21.8±0.2 kilogauss at the poles.
