= 18 Tauri =

Star in the constellation Taurus

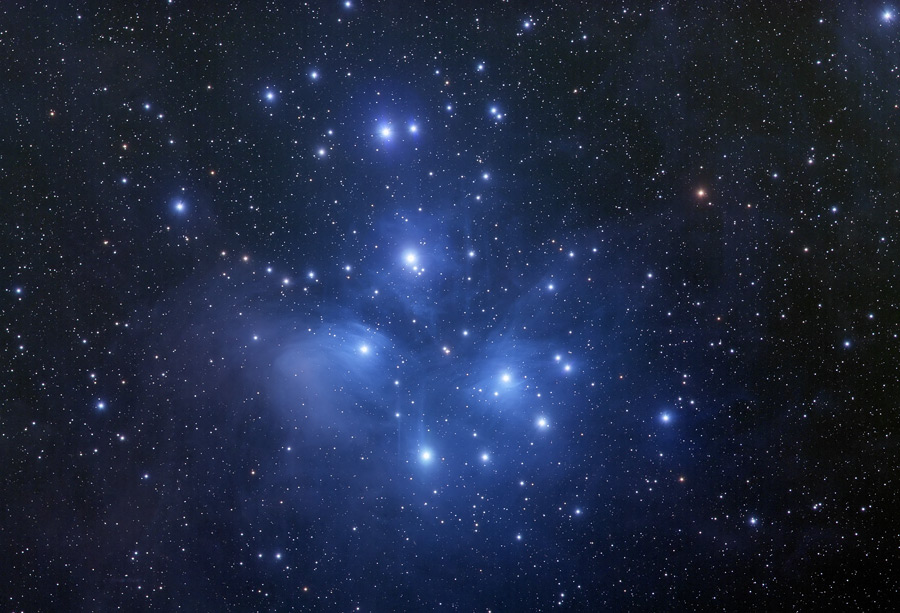
- 18 Tauri in the Pleiades, circled in red

Observation data Epoch J2000 Equinox ICRS
- Constellation: Taurus
- Right ascension: 03^{h} 45^{m} 09.74013^{s}
- Declination: +24° 50′ 21.3432″
- Apparent magnitude (V): 5.66

Characteristics
- Evolutionary stage: main sequence
- Spectral type: B8 V
- B−V color index: −0.064±0.012

Astrometry
Radial velocity (R_{v})	+4.8±0.8 km/s
Proper motion (μ)	RA: +20.218 mas/yr Dec.: −46.124 mas/yr
Parallax (π)	7.2222±0.0551 mas
Distance	452 ± 3 ly (138 ± 1 pc)
Absolute magnitude (M_{V})	0.19

Details
Mass	3.34±0.06 M_{☉}
Radius	2.89 R_{☉}
Luminosity	160+18 −15 L_{☉}
Surface gravity (log g)	4.126±0.113 cgs
Temperature	13,748±223 K
Rotational velocity (v sin i)	212 km/s
Age	204 Myr

Other designations
- 18 Tau, BD+24°546, GC 4485, HD 23324, HIP 17527, HR 1144, SAO 76137

Database references
SIMBAD	data

18 Tauri is a single star in the zodiac constellation of Taurus, located 452 light years away from the Sun. It is visible to the naked eye as a faint, blue-white hued star with an apparent visual magnitude of 5.66. The star is moving further from the Earth with a heliocentric radial velocity of +4.8 km/s. It is a member of the Pleiades open cluster, which is positioned near the ecliptic and thus is subject to lunar occultations.

This is a B-type main-sequence star with a stellar classification of B8 V, and is about halfway through its main sequence lifetime. It displays an infrared excess, suggesting the presence of an orbiting debris disk with a black body temperature of 75 K at a separation of 137.8 AU from the host star. The star has 3.34 times the mass of the Sun and 2.89 times the Sun's radius. It is radiating 160 times the Sun's luminosity from its photosphere at an effective temperature of 13,748 K. 18 Tauri has a high rate of spin, showing a projected rotational velocity of 212 km/s.
