= 31 Persei =

Star in the constellation Perseus

- Location of 31 Persei (circled)

Observation data Epoch J2000 Equinox ICRS
- Constellation: Perseus
- Right ascension: 03^{h} 19^{m} 07.63923^{s}
- Declination: 50° 05′ 41.8898″
- Apparent magnitude (V): 5.05

Characteristics
- Evolutionary stage: main sequence
- Spectral type: B5V
- U−B color index: −0.53
- B−V color index: −0.06

Astrometry
Radial velocity (R_{v})	−1.60 km/s
Proper motion (μ)	RA: +22.756 mas/yr Dec.: −24.446 mas/yr
Parallax (π)	5.7653±0.0892 mas
Distance	566 ± 9 ly (173 ± 3 pc)
Absolute magnitude (M_{V})	−1.44

Details
Mass	4.647 M_{☉}
Radius	3.4 R_{☉}
Luminosity	950 L_{☉}
Temperature	15,301 K
Metallicity [Fe/H]	0.00 dex
Rotational velocity (v sin i)	260 km/s
Age	234 Myr

Other designations
- 31 Per, BD+49°902, GC 3945, HD 20418, HIP 15444, HR 989, SAO 38714

Database references
SIMBAD	data

31 Persei is a single star in the northern constellation of Perseus. It is visible to the naked eye as a dim, blue-white hued point of light with an apparent visual magnitude of 5.05. This star is located around 172 parsecs (560 ly) away from the Sun, and it is drifting closer with a radial velocity of −1.6 km/s. It is likely a member of the Alpha Persei Cluster.

This object is a massive B-type main-sequence star with a stellar classification of B5V and it is currently generating energy through hydrogen fusion at its core. It is around 234 million years old and is spinning rapidly with a projected rotational velocity of 260 km/s. The star has 4.6 times the mass of the Sun and about 3.4 times the radius of the Sun. It is radiating 950 times the luminosity of the Sun from its photosphere at an effective temperature of 15,301 K.
