= Sigma Persei =

Star in the constellation Perseus

σ Persei
- Location of σ Persei (circled)

Observation data Epoch J2000 Equinox ICRS
- Constellation: Perseus
- Right ascension: 03^{h} 30^{m} 34.48537^{s}
- Declination: +47° 59′ 42.7789″
- Apparent magnitude (V): 4.36

Characteristics
- Evolutionary stage: horizontal branch
- Spectral type: K3III
- U−B color index: +1.54
- B−V color index: +1.35

Astrometry
Radial velocity (R_{v})	+14.32±0.15 km/s
Proper motion (μ)	RA: +3.954 mas/yr Dec.: +18.968 mas/yr
Parallax (π)	9.5060±0.2003 mas
Distance	343 ± 7 ly (105 ± 2 pc)
Absolute magnitude (M_{V})	−0.85

Details
Mass	1.32 M_{☉}
Radius	35.28±0.77 R_{☉}
Luminosity	368 L_{☉}
Surface gravity (log g)	1.46 cgs
Temperature	4,165 K
Metallicity [Fe/H]	−0.20 dex
Rotational velocity (v sin i)	2.2 km/s
Age	6.6 Gyr

Other designations
- σ Per, 35 Per, NSV 1167, BD+47 843, FK5 124, GC 4158, HD 21552, HIP 16335, HR 1052, SAO 38890, PPM 46257

Database references
SIMBAD	data

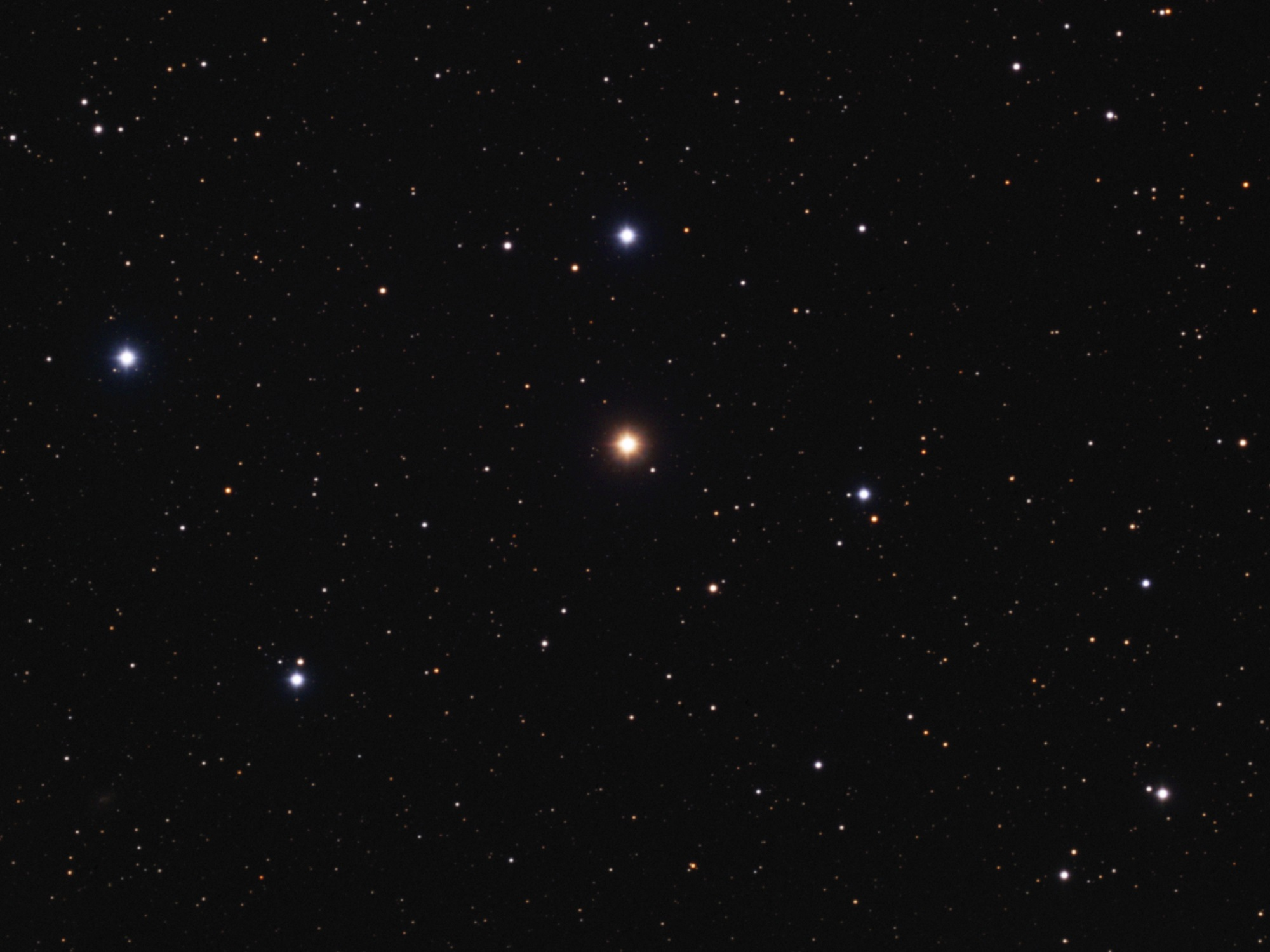
σ Persei in optical light

Sigma Persei (Sigma Per, σ Persei, σ Per) is an orange K-type giant star with an apparent magnitude of +4.36. It is approximately 343 light-years from Earth.

Sigma Persei is moving through the Galaxy at a speed of 17.4 km/s relative to the Sun. Its projected Galactic orbit carries it between 24,400 and 43,600 light years from the center of the Galaxy. It came closest to the Sun 5.1 million years ago when it had brightened to magnitude 3.11 from a distance of 202 light years.

In 2014 a planet was reported, Sigma Persei b, with a period of 580 days and a mass approximately 6.5 times that of Jupiter. However, a 2025 study found that the observed radial velocity variations are intrinsic to the star, and not caused by a planetary companion.

== Name and etymology ==
This star, together with δ Per, ψ Per, α Per, γ Per and η Per, has been called the Segment of Perseus.
