= Epsilon Persei =

Star system in the constellation Perseus

- Location of ε Persei (circled)

Observation data Epoch J2000 Equinox ICRS
- Constellation: Perseus
- Right ascension: 03^{h} 57^{m} 51.23205^{s}
- Declination: +40° 00′ 36.7752″
- Apparent magnitude (V): +2.88

Characteristics
- Spectral type: B0.5III
- U−B color index: −0.96
- B−V color index: −0.20
- Variable type: β Cep

Astrometry
Proper motion (μ)	RA: +14.06 mas/yr Dec.: −23.78 mas/yr
Parallax (π)	5.11±0.23 mas
Distance	640 ± 30 ly (196 ± 9 pc)

Orbit
Primary	Primary
Name	Secondary
Period (P)	14.06916±0.00004 d
Eccentricity (e)	0.5549±0.0093
Periastron epoch (T)	47767.543±0.024
Argument of periastron (ω) (secondary)	105.8±1.2°
Semi-amplitude (K_{1}) (primary)	15.23±0.20 km/s

Orbit
Primary	Primary/secondary
Name	Tertiary
Period (P)	26.22 yr
Eccentricity (e)	0.474±0.027
Periastron epoch (T)	35632±116
Argument of periastron (ω) (secondary)	170.4±3.3°
Semi-amplitude (K_{1}) (primary)	10.84±0.62 km/s

Details

Primary
Mass	13.5±2.0 M_{☉}
Radius	7.66 R_{☉}
Luminosity	28,330 L_{☉}
Temperature	26,500 K
Rotational velocity (v sin i)	155±20 km/s
Age	15.4±0.6 Myr

Secondary
Mass	0.85–1.77 M_{☉}
Radius	1.4±0.4 R_{☉}
Rotational velocity (v sin i)	300±30 km/s

Tertiary
Mass	2.3 M_{☉}

Other designations
- Áldu, ε Per, 45 Persei, BD+39 895, FK5 147, HD 24760, HIP 18532, HR 1220, SAO 56840

Database references
SIMBAD	data

Epsilon Persei, Latinized from ε Persei, formally named Áldu, is a Triple star system in the northern constellation of Perseus. It has a combined apparent visual magnitude of +2.88, which is bright enough to be viewed with the naked eye. Based upon parallax measurements, this system is located at a distance of roughly 640 light-years (196 parsecs) from Earth.

This is a spectroscopic binary system, which means that the presence of an orbiting companion has been revealed by radial velocity variations in the spectrum of the primary. The two components are orbiting each other with a period of 14 days at a high orbital eccentricity of 0.55. The secondary component has about 6–13% of the primary's mass and may have a stellar classification in the range from A6 V to K1 V. There may be a third component to this system with an orbital period of roughly 9,428 days (25.8 years), although this has not been conclusively demonstrated. If this component exists, it would have about 51–139% of the primary's mass. This high level of uncertainty is because the inclination of the orbit is not known.

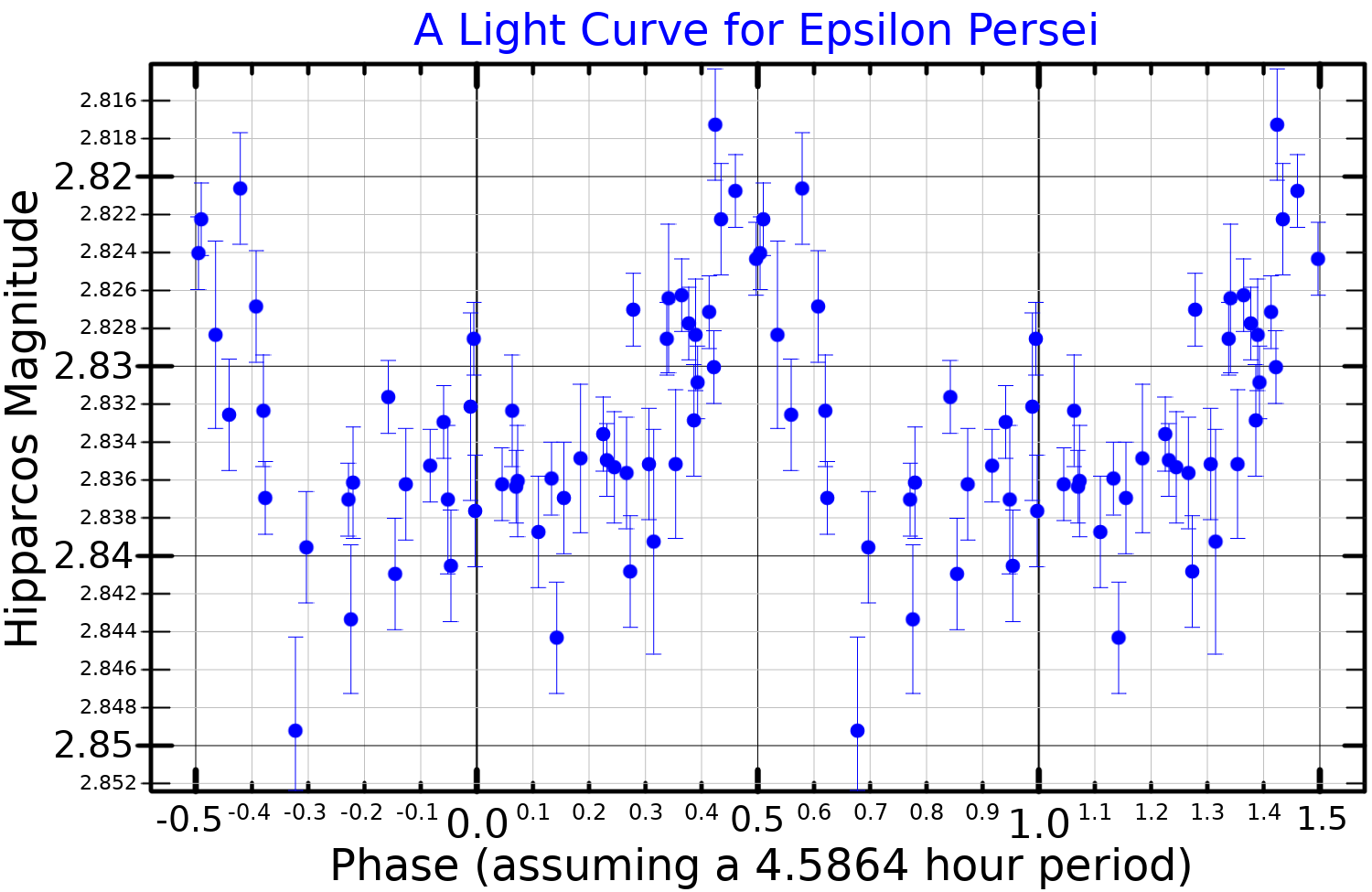
A light curve for Epsilon Persei, plotted from Hipparcos data

The primary component of this system is a massive star with 12–16 times the Sun's mass and near eight times the radius of the Sun. It was chosen as an MK spectral standard for the class B0.5III, making it a giant star that has evolved away from the main sequence. It has also been classified as a main sequence star, reflecting its evolutionary state near or slightly beyind the end of core hydrogen fusion. Component A is radiating over 28,000 times the Sun's luminosity from its outer envelope at an effective temperature of 26,500 K. This gives the star the blue-white hue that is typical of B-type stars. It is also a Beta Cephei variable star with a primary pulsation period of 0.1603 days, or 6.24 cycles per day. It may have multiple pulsation frequencies.

Epsilon Persei has several resolved companions listed in multiple star catalogues: component B is a 9th-magnitude A2 main sequence star 9″ away and considered to be a common proper motion companion although they are too far apart for any orbital motion to be observed; component C is a 14th-magnitude background star about 80″ away; and HD 275984 163″ away is thought to be another common-proper-motion companion.

In Sámi culture, Epsilon Persei is part of Sarvvis (or Sarvva), the reindeer or moose, a large constellation in Cassiopeia, Perseus, and Auriga. Sarvvis is pursued by the hunter Fávdna, the star Arcturus. While the word Sarvvis refers to a male reindeer, it is described as keeping its antlers during winter, which only female reindeer do. The Sámi word for a female reindeer is Áldu. The IAU Working Group on Star Names approved the name Áldu for ε Persei A on 25 December 2025, and it is now so entered in the IAU Catalog of Star Names. δ Persei A, was given the proper name Sarvvis.
