= B-type main-sequence star =

Stellar classification distinguished by bright blue luminosity

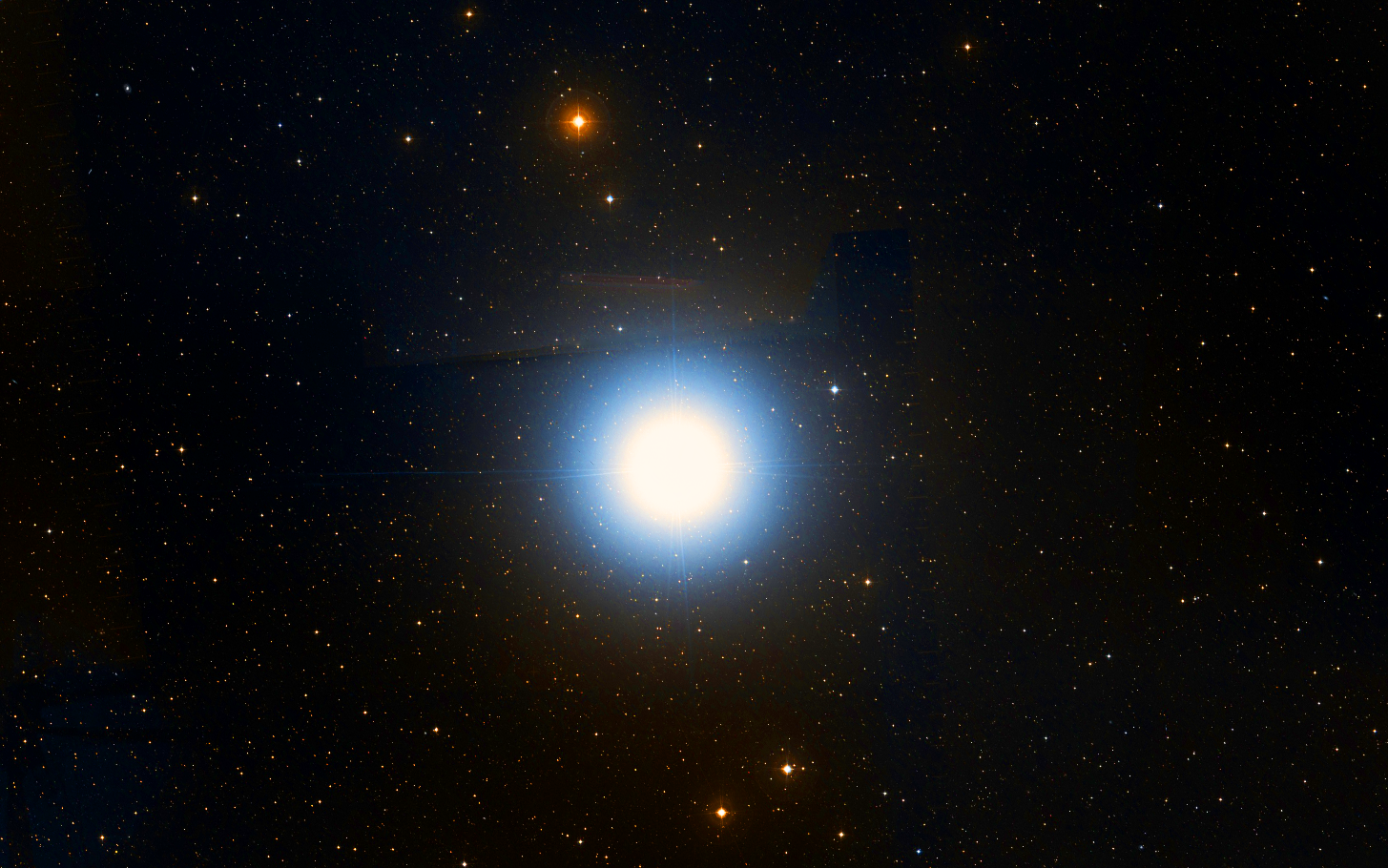
- Achernar is the brightest B-type main-sequence star, as viewed from Earth (Note: Whilst the B-type star Rigel is brighter, it is a blue supergiant rather than a main-sequence star.)

Characteristics
- Type: Class of large and bright main sequence star
- Mass range: 2.75–18 M_{☉}
- Temperature: 10,700–31,400 K
- Average luminosity: 73–45,000 L_{☉}

External links
- Media category
- Q767432

Additional Information

A B-type main-sequence star (Note: Also called a "B-type dwarf" or "blue-white dwarf") is a main-sequence (core hydrogen-burning) star of spectral type B. The spectral luminosity class is given as V. These stars have from 2 to 18 times the mass of the Sun and surface temperatures between about 10,000 and 30,000 K.

B-type stars are luminous and blue-white. Their spectra have strong neutral helium absorption lines, which are most prominent at the B2 subclass, and moderately strong hydrogen lines. Examples include Regulus, Algol A and Acrux.

== History ==
This class of stars was introduced with the Harvard sequence of stellar spectra and published in the Revised Harvard photometry catalogue. The definition of type B-type stars was the presence of non-ionized helium lines with the absence of singly ionized helium in the blue-violet portion of the spectrum. All of the spectral classes, including the B type, were subdivided with a numerical suffix that indicated the degree to which they approached the next classification. Thus B2 is 1/5 of the way from type B (or B0) to type A.

Later, however, more refined spectra showed lines of ionized helium for stars of type B0. Likewise, A0 stars also show weak lines of non-ionized helium. Subsequent catalogues of stellar spectra classified the stars based on the strengths of absorption lines at specific frequencies, or by comparing the strengths of different lines. Thus, in the MK Classification system, the spectral class B0 has the line at wavelength 439 nm being stronger than the line at 420 nm. The Balmer series of hydrogen lines grows stronger through the B class, then peak at type A2. The lines of ionized silicon are used to determine the sub-class of the B-type stars, while magnesium lines are used to distinguish between the temperature classes.

== Properties ==
Properties of typical B-type main-sequence stars
Spectral type	Mass (M_{☉})	Radius (R_{☉})	Luminosity (L_{☉})	Effective temperature (K)	Color index (B − V)
B0V	17.70	7.16	44,875	31,400	-0.301
B1V	11.80	5.71	13,428	26,000	-0.278
B2V	7.30	4.06	2,679	20,600	-0.215
B3V	5.40	3.61	982	17,000	-0.178
B4V	5.10	3.46	780	16,400	-0.165
B5V	4.70	3.36	592	15,700	-0.156
B6V	4.30	3.27	370	14,500	-0.140
B7V	3.92	2.94	299	14,000	-0.128
B8V	3.38	2.86	154	12,300	-0.109
B9V	2.75	2.49	73	10,700	-0.070

Type-B stars do not have a corona and lack a convection zone in their outer atmosphere. They have a higher mass loss rate than smaller stars such as the Sun, and their stellar wind has velocities of about 3,000 km/s. The energy generation in main-sequence B-type stars comes from the CNO cycle of thermonuclear fusion. Because the CNO cycle is very temperature sensitive, the energy generation is heavily concentrated at the center of the star, which results in a convection zone about the core. This results in a steady mixing of the hydrogen fuel with the helium byproduct of the nuclear fusion. Many B-type stars have a rapid rate of rotation, with an equatorial rotation velocity of about 200 km/s.

== Be and B[e] stars ==
Spectral objects known as "Be stars" are massive yet non-supergiant entities that notably have, or had at some time, 1 or more Balmer lines in emission, with the hydrogen-related electromagnetic radiation series projected out by the stars being of particular scientific interest. Be stars are generally thought to feature unusually strong stellar winds, high surface temperatures, and significant attrition of stellar mass as the objects rotate at a curiously rapid rate, all of this in contrast to many other main-sequence star types.

Objects known as B[e] stars are distinct from Be stars in having unusual neutral or low ionization emission lines that are considered to have 'forbidden mechanisms', something denoted by the use of the square brackets. In other words, these particular stars' emissions appear to undergo processes not normally allowed under 1st-order perturbation theory in quantum mechanics. The definition of a B[e] star can include blue giants and blue supergiants.

== Spectral standard stars ==
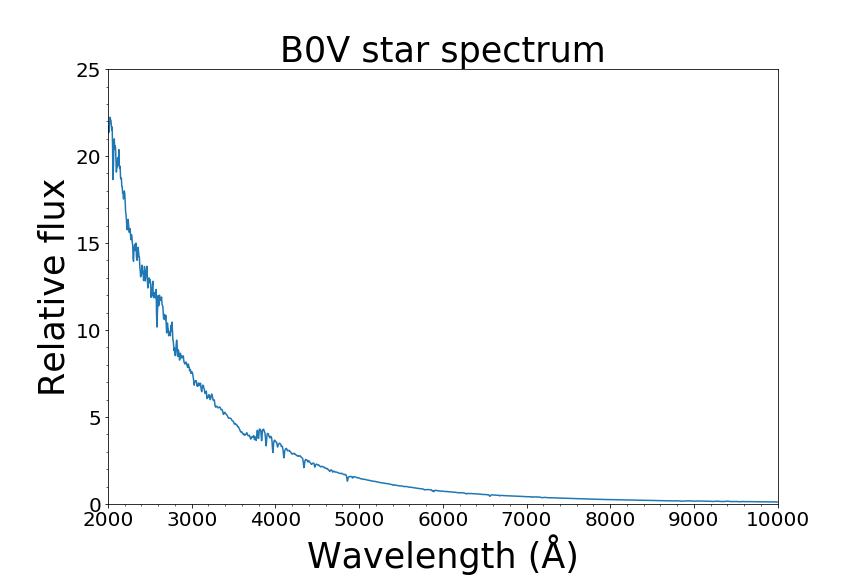
Spectrum of B0V star

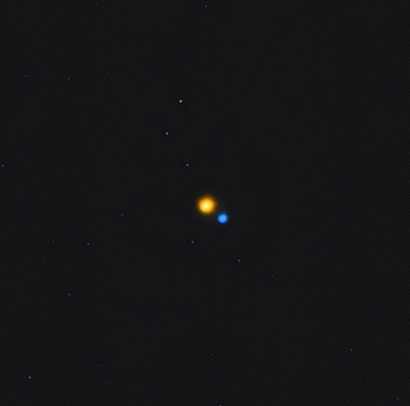
The secondary component of the double star Albireo is a B8 main sequence star, the blue contrasting with the cooler yellow giant primary.

The revised Yerkes Atlas system (Johnson & Morgan 1953) listed a dense grid of B-type dwarf spectral standard stars, however not all of these have survived to this day as standards. The "anchor points" of the MK spectral classification system among the B-type main-sequence stars, i.e. those standard stars that have remain unchanged since at least the 1940s, are Upsilon Orionis (B0 V), Eta Aurigae (B3 V), and Alkaid (B3 V). Besides these anchor standards, the seminal review of MK classification by Morgan & Keenan (1973) listed "dagger standards" of Tau Scorpii (B0 V), Omega Scorpii (B1 V), 42 Orionis (B1 V), 22 Scorpii (B3 V), Rho Aurigae (B5 V), and 18 Tauri (B8 V). The Revised MK Spectra Atlas of Morgan, Abt, & Tapscott (1978) further contributed the standards Acrab (B2 V), 29 Persei (B3 V), HD 36936 (B5 V), and HD 21071 (B7 V). Gray & Garrison (1994) contributed two B9 V standards: Omega Fornacis and HR 2328. The only published B4 V standard is 90 Leonis, from Lesh (1968).

== Chemical peculiarities ==
Some of the B-type stars of stellar class B0–B3 exhibit unusually strong lines of non-ionized helium. These chemically peculiar stars are termed helium-strong stars. These often have strong magnetic fields in their photosphere. In contrast, there are also helium-weak B-type stars with understrength helium lines and strong hydrogen spectra. Other chemically peculiar B-types stars are the mercury-manganese stars with spectral types B7-B9.

== Planets ==
B-type stars known to have planets include the main-sequence B-type HIP 78530, KELT-9, HIP 79098 and HD 129116.

== See also ==
- Herbig Ae/Be star
- Star count
