= 48 Persei =

Star in the constellation Perseus

- Location of 48 Persei (circled)

Observation data Epoch J2000 Equinox ICRS
- Constellation: Perseus
- Right ascension: 04^{h} 08^{m} 39.69216^{s}
- Declination: +47° 42′ 45.0429″
- Apparent magnitude (V): 4.03

Characteristics
- Evolutionary stage: Main sequence
- Spectral type: B3Ve
- U−B color index: -0.55
- B−V color index: -0.03
- Variable type: γ Cas

Astrometry
Radial velocity (R_{v})	+0.80 km/s
Proper motion (μ)	RA: +21.73 mas/yr Dec.: -33.61 mas/yr
Parallax (π)	6.84±0.16 mas
Distance	480 ± 10 ly (146 ± 3 pc)
Absolute magnitude (M_{V})	-1.86

Details
Mass	7.5 M_{☉}
Luminosity	600 L_{☉}
Surface gravity (log g)	3.86 cgs
Temperature	17,490 K
Metallicity [Fe/H]	-0.04 dex
Rotational velocity (v sin i)	197 km/s

Other designations
- c Persei, MX Persei, BD+47°939, FK5 152, GC 4967, HIP 19343, HR 1273, HD 25940, SAO 39336

Database references
SIMBAD	data

48 Persei (also known as c Persei, 48 Per, HR 1273, HIP 19343, or HD 25940) is a Be star in the constellation Perseus, approximately the 500th brightest of the visible stars in apparent magnitude. It is "well known for its complex spectrum and for its light and velocity variations". The name "48 Persei" is a Flamsteed designation given to it by John Flamsteed in his catalogue, published in 1712.

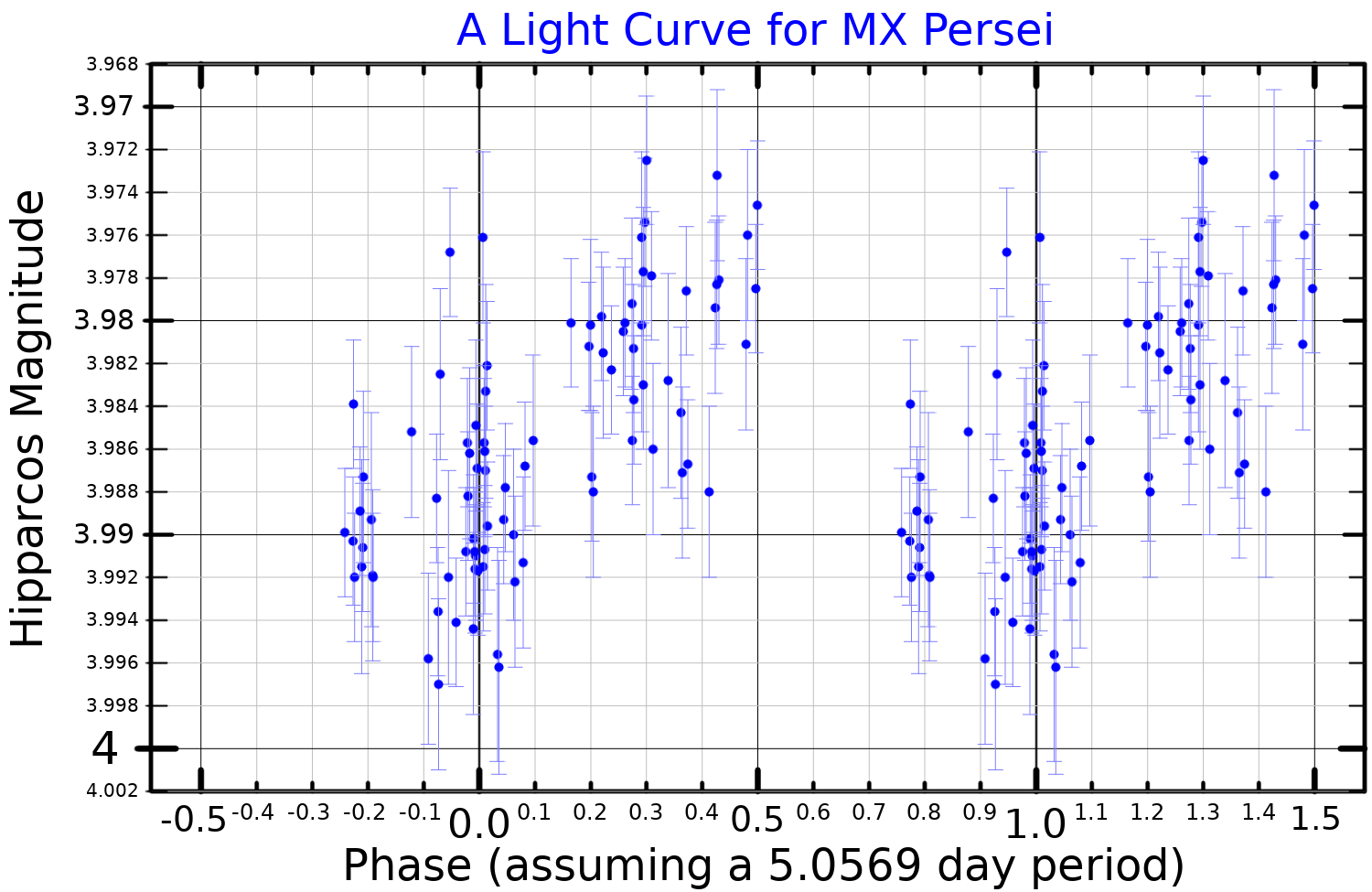
A light curve for MX Persei, plotted from Hipparcos data

48 Persei is classified as a Gamma Cassiopeiae variable, and it has been given the variable star designation MX Persei. The star's brightness varies by 0.09 magnitudes in visible light. Koen and Eyer examined the Hipparcos data for this star, and found it varied with a period of 5.0569 days.

As a Be star, it is hot and blue, spinning so rapidly that it forms an unstable equatorial disk of matter surrounding it. Its mass has been estimated as seven times that of the Sun, and its estimated age of 40 million years makes it much younger than the Sun. In another few million years it will likely cease hydrogen fusion, expand, and brighten as it becomes a red giant.

A 1989 study proposed 48 Persei to be a single-lined spectroscopic binary with a period of 16.6 days, but subsequent studies, including close imaging surveys, have not confirmed this result. Hutter et al. (2021) consider it to be a single star.
