= Hydra in Chinese astronomy =

The modern constellation Hydra lies across two of the quadrants, symbolized by the Azure Dragon of the East (東方青龍, Dōng Fāng Qīng Lóng) and the Vermilion Bird of the South (南方朱雀, Nán Fāng Zhū Què), that divide the sky in traditional Chinese uranography.

The name of the western constellation in modern Chinese is 長蛇座 (cháng shé zuò), which means "the long snake constellation".

== Stars ==
The map of Chinese constellation in constellation Hydra area consists of:

Four Symbols	Mansion (Chinese name)	Romanization	Translation	Asterisms (Chinese name)	Romanization	Translation	Western star name	Proper Name	Chinese star name	Romanization	Translation
Azure Dragon of the East (東方青龍)	角	Jiǎo	Horn	平	Píng	Justice					
Azure Dragon of the East (東方青龍)	角	Jiǎo	Horn	平	Píng	Justice	γ Hya	Naga			
Azure Dragon of the East (東方青龍)	角	Jiǎo	Horn	平	Píng	Justice	γ Hya	Naga	平一	Píngyī	1st star
Azure Dragon of the East (東方青龍)	角	Jiǎo	Horn	平	Píng	Justice	γ Hya	Naga	平西星	Píngxīxīng	Western star
Azure Dragon of the East (東方青龍)	角	Jiǎo	Horn	平	Píng	Justice	π Hya		平二	Píngèr	2nd star
Azure Dragon of the East (東方青龍)	角	Jiǎo	Horn	折威	Shéwēi	Executions					
Azure Dragon of the East (東方青龍)	角	Jiǎo	Horn	折威	Shéwēi	Executions	50 Hya		折威一	Shéwēiyī	1st star
Azure Dragon of the East (東方青龍)	角	Jiǎo	Horn	折威	Shéwēi	Executions	51 Hya		折威增二	Shéwēizēngèr	2nd additional star
Azure Dragon of the East (東方青龍)	角	Jiǎo	Horn	折威	Shéwēi	Executions	54 Hya		折威增三	Shéwēizēngsān	3rd additional star
Azure Dragon of the East (東方青龍)	角	Jiǎo	Horn	折威	Shéwēi	Executions	55 Hya		折威增四	Shéwēizēngsì	4th additional star
Azure Dragon of the East (東方青龍)	角	Jiǎo	Horn	折威	Shéwēi	Executions	56 Hya		折威增五	Shéwēizēngwǔ	5th additional star
Azure Dragon of the East (東方青龍)	角	Jiǎo	Horn	折威	Shéwēi	Executions	HD 131992		折威增六	Shéwēizēngliù	6th additional star
Azure Dragon of the East (東方青龍)	角	Jiǎo	Horn	折威	Shéwēi	Executions	57 Hya		折威增七	Shéwēizēngqī	7th additional star
Azure Dragon of the East (東方青龍)	角	Jiǎo	Horn	陣車	Zhènchē	Battle Chariots					
Azure Dragon of the East (東方青龍)	角	Jiǎo	Horn	陣車	Zhènchē	Battle Chariots	58 Hya	Solitaire	陣車一	Zhènchēyī	1st star
Azure Dragon of the East (東方青龍)	角	Jiǎo	Horn	陣車	Zhènchē	Battle Chariots	60 Hya		陣車二	Zhènchēèr	2nd star
Azure Dragon of the East (東方青龍)	角	Jiǎo	Horn	陣車	Zhènchē	Battle Chariots	59 Hya		陣車增二	Zhènchēzēngèr	2nd additional star
Vermilion Bird of the South (南方朱雀)	鬼	Guǐ	Ghost	外廚	Wàichú	Outer Kitchen					
Vermilion Bird of the South (南方朱雀)	鬼	Guǐ	Ghost	外廚	Wàichú	Outer Kitchen	2 Hya		外廚一	Wàichúyī	1st star
Vermilion Bird of the South (南方朱雀)	鬼	Guǐ	Ghost	外廚	Wàichú	Outer Kitchen	F Hya		外廚二	Wàichúèr	2nd star
Vermilion Bird of the South (南方朱雀)	鬼	Guǐ	Ghost	外廚	Wàichú	Outer Kitchen	14 Hya		外廚三	Wàichúsān	3rd star
Vermilion Bird of the South (南方朱雀)	鬼	Guǐ	Ghost	外廚	Wàichú	Outer Kitchen	1 Hya		外廚增二	Wàichúzēngèr	2nd additional star
Vermilion Bird of the South (南方朱雀)	鬼	Guǐ	Ghost	外廚	Wàichú	Outer Kitchen	c Hya		外廚增三	Wàichúzēngsān	3rd additional star
Vermilion Bird of the South (南方朱雀)	鬼	Guǐ	Ghost	外廚	Wàichú	Outer Kitchen	14 Hya		外廚增四	Wàichúzēngsì	4th additional star
Vermilion Bird of the South (南方朱雀)	鬼	Guǐ	Ghost	外廚	Wàichú	Outer Kitchen	15 Hya		外廚增六	Wàichúzēngliù	6th additional star
Vermilion Bird of the South (南方朱雀)	鬼	Guǐ	Ghost	外廚	Wàichú	Outer Kitchen	17 Hya		外廚增七	Wàichúzēngqī	7th additional star
Vermilion Bird of the South (南方朱雀)	鬼	Guǐ	Ghost	外廚	Wàichú	Outer Kitchen	6 Hya		外廚增八	Wàichúzēngbā	8th additional star
Vermilion Bird of the South (南方朱雀)	鬼	Guǐ	Ghost	外廚	Wàichú	Outer Kitchen	12 Hya		外廚增九	Wàichúzēngjiǔ	9th additional star
Vermilion Bird of the South (南方朱雀)	鬼	Guǐ	Ghost	外廚	Wàichú	Outer Kitchen	9 Hya		外廚增十	Wàichúzēngshí	10th additional star
Vermilion Bird of the South (南方朱雀)	柳	Liǔ	Willow	柳	Liǔ	Willow					
Vermilion Bird of the South (南方朱雀)	柳	Liǔ	Willow	柳	Liǔ	Willow	δ Hya				
Vermilion Bird of the South (南方朱雀)	柳	Liǔ	Willow	柳	Liǔ	Willow	δ Hya		柳宿一	Liǔsùyī	1st star
Vermilion Bird of the South (南方朱雀)	柳	Liǔ	Willow	柳	Liǔ	Willow	δ Hya		柳宿距星	Liǔsùjùxīng	Separated star
Vermilion Bird of the South (南方朱雀)	柳	Liǔ	Willow	柳	Liǔ	Willow	δ Hya		柳宿西头第三星	Liǔsùxītóudìsānxīng	3rd star in the west of three stars of Three Stars
Vermilion Bird of the South (南方朱雀)	柳	Liǔ	Willow	柳	Liǔ	Willow	δ Hya		玉井西北星	Yùjǐngxīběixīng	Star in the southwest of Jade Well constellation
Vermilion Bird of the South (南方朱雀)	柳	Liǔ	Willow	柳	Liǔ	Willow	δ Hya		午	Wǔ	
Vermilion Bird of the South (南方朱雀)	柳	Liǔ	Willow	柳	Liǔ	Willow	δ Hya		鹑火星	Chúnhuǒxīng	Quail of Mars
Vermilion Bird of the South (南方朱雀)	柳	Liǔ	Willow	柳	Liǔ	Willow	σ Hya	Minchir	柳宿二	Liǔsùèr	2nd star
Vermilion Bird of the South (南方朱雀)	柳	Liǔ	Willow	柳	Liǔ	Willow	η Hya		柳宿三	Liǔsùsān	3rd star
Vermilion Bird of the South (南方朱雀)	柳	Liǔ	Willow	柳	Liǔ	Willow	ρ Hya		柳宿四	Liǔsùsì	4th star
Vermilion Bird of the South (南方朱雀)	柳	Liǔ	Willow	柳	Liǔ	Willow	ε Hya	Ashlesha (for component A)	柳宿五	Liǔsùwǔ	5th star
Vermilion Bird of the South (南方朱雀)	柳	Liǔ	Willow	柳	Liǔ	Willow	ζ Hya		柳宿六	Liǔsùliù	6th star
Vermilion Bird of the South (南方朱雀)	柳	Liǔ	Willow	柳	Liǔ	Willow	ω Hya		柳宿七	Liǔsùqī	7th star
Vermilion Bird of the South (南方朱雀)	柳	Liǔ	Willow	柳	Liǔ	Willow	θ Hya		柳宿八	Liǔsùbā	8th star
Vermilion Bird of the South (南方朱雀)	柳	Liǔ	Willow	柳	Liǔ	Willow	10 Hya		柳宿增一	Liǔsùzēngyī	1st additional star
Vermilion Bird of the South (南方朱雀)	星	Xīng	Star	星	Xīng	Star					
Vermilion Bird of the South (南方朱雀)	星	Xīng	Star	星	Xīng	Star	α Hya	Alphard			
Vermilion Bird of the South (南方朱雀)	星	Xīng	Star	星	Xīng	Star	α Hya	Alphard	星宿一	Xīngsùyī	1st star
Vermilion Bird of the South (南方朱雀)	星	Xīng	Star	星	Xīng	Star	α Hya	Alphard	星宿距星	Xīngsùjùxīng	Separated star
Vermilion Bird of the South (南方朱雀)	星	Xīng	Star	星	Xīng	Star	α Hya	Alphard	蛇首一	Shéshǒuyī	Leading (star) in "snake" and stand alone
Vermilion Bird of the South (南方朱雀)	星	Xīng	Star	星	Xīng	Star	α Hya	Alphard	星宿中央大星	Xīngsùzhōngyāngdàxīng	Big center star
Vermilion Bird of the South (南方朱雀)	星	Xīng	Star	星	Xīng	Star	τ^{1} Hya		星宿二	Xīngsùèr	2nd star
Vermilion Bird of the South (南方朱雀)	星	Xīng	Star	星	Xīng	Star	τ^{2} Hya		星宿三	Xīngsùsān	3rd star
Vermilion Bird of the South (南方朱雀)	星	Xīng	Star	星	Xīng	Star	ι Hya	Ukdah	星宿四	Xīngsùsì	4th star
Vermilion Bird of the South (南方朱雀)	星	Xīng	Star	星	Xīng	Star	27 Hya		星宿五	Xīngsùwǔ	5th star
Vermilion Bird of the South (南方朱雀)	星	Xīng	Star	星	Xīng	Star	26 Hya		星宿六	Xīngsùliù	6th star
Vermilion Bird of the South (南方朱雀)	星	Xīng	Star	星	Xīng	Star	HD 82428		星宿七	Xīngsùqī	7th star
Vermilion Bird of the South (南方朱雀)	星	Xīng	Star	星	Xīng	Star	29 Hya		星宿增一	Xīngsùzēngyī	1st additional star
Vermilion Bird of the South (南方朱雀)	星	Xīng	Star	星	Xīng	Star	24 Hya		星宿增二	Xīngsùzēngèr	2nd additional star
Vermilion Bird of the South (南方朱雀)	星	Xīng	Star	星	Xīng	Star	20 Hya		星宿增三	Xīngsùzēngsān	3rd additional star
Vermilion Bird of the South (南方朱雀)	星	Xīng	Star	星	Xīng	Star	19 Hya		星宿增四	Xīngsùzēngsì	4th additional star
Vermilion Bird of the South (南方朱雀)	星	Xīng	Star	星	Xīng	Star	21 Hya		星宿增五	Xīngsùzēngwǔ	5th additional star
Vermilion Bird of the South (南方朱雀)	星	Xīng	Star	星	Xīng	Star	23 Hya		星宿增六	Xīngsùzēngliù	6th additional star
Vermilion Bird of the South (南方朱雀)	星	Xīng	Star	星	Xīng	Star	28 Hya		星宿增七	Xīngsùzēngqī	7th additional star
Vermilion Bird of the South (南方朱雀)	星	Xīng	Star	星	Xīng	Star	33 Hya		星宿增八	Xīngsùzēngbā	8th additional star
Vermilion Bird of the South (南方朱雀)	星	Xīng	Star	星	Xīng	Star	37 Hya		星宿增十三	Xīngsùzēngshísān	13th additional star
Vermilion Bird of the South (南方朱雀)	星	Xīng	Star	星	Xīng	Star	34 Hya		星宿增十五	Xīngsùzēngshíwǔ	15th additional star
Vermilion Bird of the South (南方朱雀)	星	Xīng	Star	軒轅	Xuānyuán	Xuanyuan	2 Sex		軒轅增四十六	Xuānyuánzēngsìshíliù	46th additional star
Vermilion Bird of the South (南方朱雀)	張	Zhāng	Extended Net	張	Zhāng	Extended Net					
Vermilion Bird of the South (南方朱雀)	張	Zhāng	Extended Net	張	Zhāng	Extended Net	υ^{1} Hya	Zhang			
Vermilion Bird of the South (南方朱雀)	張	Zhāng	Extended Net	張	Zhāng	Extended Net	υ^{1} Hya	Zhang	張宿一	Zhāngsùyī	1st star
Vermilion Bird of the South (南方朱雀)	張	Zhāng	Extended Net	張	Zhāng	Extended Net	υ^{1} Hya	Zhang	張宿距星	Zhāngsùjùxīng	Separated star
Vermilion Bird of the South (南方朱雀)	張	Zhāng	Extended Net	張	Zhāng	Extended Net	υ^{1} Hya	Zhang	張宿西第二星	Zhāngsùxīdìèrxīng	2nd western star
Vermilion Bird of the South (南方朱雀)	張	Zhāng	Extended Net	張	Zhāng	Extended Net	λ Hya		張宿二	Zhāngsùèr	2nd star
Vermilion Bird of the South (南方朱雀)	張	Zhāng	Extended Net	張	Zhāng	Extended Net	μ Hya		張宿三	Zhāngsùsān	3rd star
Vermilion Bird of the South (南方朱雀)	張	Zhāng	Extended Net	張	Zhāng	Extended Net	HD 87344		張宿四	Zhāngsùsì	4th star
Vermilion Bird of the South (南方朱雀)	張	Zhāng	Extended Net	張	Zhāng	Extended Net	κ Hya		張宿五	Zhāngsùwǔ	5th star
Vermilion Bird of the South (南方朱雀)	張	Zhāng	Extended Net	張	Zhāng	Extended Net	φ^{1} Hya		張宿六	Zhāngsùliù	6th star
Vermilion Bird of the South (南方朱雀)	張	Zhāng	Extended Net	張	Zhāng	Extended Net	υ^{2} Hya		張宿增一	Zhāngsùzēngyī	1st additional star
Vermilion Bird of the South (南方朱雀)	張	Zhāng	Extended Net	張	Zhāng	Extended Net	φ^{2} Hya		張宿增三	Zhāngsùzēngsān	3rd additional star
Vermilion Bird of the South (南方朱雀)	張	Zhāng	Extended Net	張	Zhāng	Extended Net	44 Hya		張宿增四	Zhāngsùzēngsì	4th additional star
Vermilion Bird of the South (南方朱雀)	張	Zhāng	Extended Net	張	Zhāng	Extended Net	HD 88215		張宿增五	Zhāngsùzēngwǔ	5th additional star
Vermilion Bird of the South (南方朱雀)	翼	Yì	Wings	翼	Yì	Wings					
Vermilion Bird of the South (南方朱雀)	翼	Yì	Wings	翼	Yì	Wings	ν Hya		翼宿五	Yìsùwǔ	5th star
Vermilion Bird of the South (南方朱雀)	翼	Yì	Wings	翼	Yì	Wings	HD 100307		翼宿十八	Yìsùshíbā	18th star
Vermilion Bird of the South (南方朱雀)	翼	Yì	Wings	翼	Yì	Wings	HD 96819		翼宿十九	Yìsùshíjiǔ	19th star
Vermilion Bird of the South (南方朱雀)	翼	Yì	Wings	翼	Yì	Wings	χ^{1} Hya		翼宿二十	Yìsùèrshí	20th star
Vermilion Bird of the South (南方朱雀)	翼	Yì	Wings	翼	Yì	Wings	II Hya		翼宿二十一	Yìsùèrshíyī	21st star
Vermilion Bird of the South (南方朱雀)	翼	Yì	Wings	翼	Yì	Wings	HD 103462		翼宿二十二	Yìsùèrshíèr	22nd star
Vermilion Bird of the South (南方朱雀)	翼	Yì	Wings	翼	Yì	Wings	b^{1} Hya		翼宿增三	Yìsùzēngsān	3rd additional star
Vermilion Bird of the South (南方朱雀)	翼	Yì	Wings	翼	Yì	Wings	b^{3} Hya		翼翼宿增五	Yìsùèrzēngwǔ	5th additional star
Vermilion Bird of the South (南方朱雀)	翼	Yì	Wings	翼	Yì	Wings	HD 95698		翼宿增六	Yìsùèrzēngliù	6th additional star
Vermilion Bird of the South (南方朱雀)	翼	Yì	Wings	翼	Yì	Wings	HD 96819		翼宿增七	Yìsùèrzēngqī	7th additional star
Vermilion Bird of the South (南方朱雀)	軫	Zhěn	Chariot	青丘	Qīngqiū	Green Hill					
Vermilion Bird of the South (南方朱雀)	軫	Zhěn	Chariot	青丘	Qīngqiū	Green Hill	β Hya				
Vermilion Bird of the South (南方朱雀)	軫	Zhěn	Chariot	青丘	Qīngqiū	Green Hill	β Hya		青丘一	Qīngqiūyī	1st star
Vermilion Bird of the South (南方朱雀)	軫	Zhěn	Chariot	青丘	Qīngqiū	Green Hill	β Hya		土公西星	Tǔgōngxīxīng	Star in the west on Official for Earthworks and Buildings constellation
Vermilion Bird of the South (南方朱雀)	軫	Zhěn	Chariot	青丘	Qīngqiū	Green Hill	HD 104213		青丘二	Qīngqiūèr	2nd star
Vermilion Bird of the South (南方朱雀)	軫	Zhěn	Chariot	青丘	Qīngqiū	Green Hill	17 Crt		青丘三	Qīngqiūsān	3rd star
Vermilion Bird of the South (南方朱雀)	軫	Zhěn	Chariot	青丘	Qīngqiū	Green Hill	HD 100393		青丘四	Qīngqiūsì	4th star
Vermilion Bird of the South (南方朱雀)	軫	Zhěn	Chariot	青丘	Qīngqiū	Green Hill	ξ Hya		青丘五	Qīngqiūwǔ	5th star
Vermilion Bird of the South (南方朱雀)	軫	Zhěn	Chariot	青丘	Qīngqiū	Green Hill	HD 100623		青丘六	Qīngqiūliù	6th star
Vermilion Bird of the South (南方朱雀)	軫	Zhěn	Chariot	青丘	Qīngqiū	Green Hill	ο Hya		青丘七	Qīngqiūqī	7th star
Vermilion Bird of the South (南方朱雀)	軫	Zhěn	Chariot	青丘	Qīngqiū	Green Hill	HD 101666		青丘增一	Qīngqiūzēngyī	1st additional star
Vermilion Bird of the South (南方朱雀)	軫	Zhěn	Chariot	青丘	Qīngqiū	Green Hill	HD 100953		青丘增二	Qīngqiūzēngèr	2nd additional star
Vermilion Bird of the South (南方朱雀)	軫	Zhěn	Chariot	青丘	Qīngqiū	Green Hill	HD 100910		青丘增三	Qīngqiūzēngsān	3rd additional star

== See also ==
- Chinese astronomy
- Traditional Chinese star names
- Chinese constellations
