= List of stars in Hydra =

This is the list of notable stars in the constellation Hydra, sorted by decreasing brightness.

| Name | B | F | G. | Var | HD | HIP | RA | Dec | vis. mag. | abs. mag. | Dist. (ly) | Sp. class | Notes |
|---|---|---|---|---|---|---|---|---|---|---|---|---|---|
| Alphard | α | 30 | 140 | | 81797 | 46390 | 09^{h} 27^{m} 35.25^{s} | −08° 39′ 31.3″ | 1.99 | −1.69 | 177 | K3III | Alfard, Kalbelaphard, Cor Hydrae, Soheil al Fard, Soheil Solitarius |
| γ Hya | γ | 46 | 345 | | 115659 | 64962 | 13^{h} 18^{m} 55.25^{s} | −23° 10′ 17.1″ | 2.99 | −0.05 | 132 | G8III | Naga, Dhanab al Shudja; Cauda Hydrae |
| ζ Hya | ζ | 16 | 77 | | 76294 | 43813 | 08^{h} 55^{m} 23.68^{s} | +05° 56′ 43.9″ | 3.11 | −0.21 | 151 | G8III-IV | Hydrobius; Minazal V |
| ν Hya | ν | | 254 | | 93813 | 52943 | 10^{h} 49^{m} 37.43^{s} | −16° 11′ 38.9″ | 3.11 | −0.03 | 138 | K0/K1III | |
| π Hya | π | 49 | 368 | | 123123 | 68895 | 14^{h} 06^{m} 22.27^{s} | −26° 40′ 55.3″ | 3.25 | 0.79 | 101 | K2III | |
| ε Hya | ε | 11 | 59 | | 74874 | 43109 | 08^{h} 46^{m} 46.65^{s} | +06° 25′ 08.1″ | 3.38 | 0.29 | 135 | G0III-IV | Ashlesha, BY Draconis variable |
| ξ Hya | ξ | | 288 | | 100407 | 56343 | 11^{h} 33^{m} 00.26^{s} | −31° 51′ 27.1″ | 3.54 | 0.55 | 129 | G8III | |
| λ Hya | λ | 41 | 201 | | 88284 | 49841 | 10^{h} 10^{m} 35.40^{s} | −12° 21′ 13.8″ | 3.61 | 0.88 | 115 | K0III | |
| μ Hya | μ | 42 | 221 | | 90432 | 51069 | 10^{h} 26^{m} 05.51^{s} | −16° 50′ 09.9″ | 3.83 | −0.58 | 248 | K4III | |
| θ Hya | θ | 22 | 108 | | 79469 | 45336 | 09^{h} 14^{m} 21.79^{s} | +02° 18′ 54.1″ | 3.89 | 0.91 | 129 | B9.5V | |
| ι Hya | ι | 35 | 170 | | 83618 | 47431 | 09^{h} 39^{m} 51.33^{s} | −01° 08′ 33.6″ | 3.90 | −0.74 | 276 | K3IIIvar | Ukdah; Ukdah IV |
| 30 Mon | C | (30) | 19 | | 71155 | 41307 | 08^{h} 25^{m} 39.67^{s} | −03° 54′ 22.9″ | 3.91 | 0.99 | 125 | A0V | |
| υ^{1} Hya | υ^{1} | 39 | 178 | | 85444 | 48356 | 09^{h} 51^{m} 28.68^{s} | −14° 50′ 47.6″ | 4.11 | −0.51 | 273 | G6/G8III | Zhang, has a brown dwarf companion |
| δ Hya | δ | 4 | 36 | | 73262 | 42313 | 08^{h} 37^{m} 39.41^{s} | +05° 42′ 13.7″ | 4.14 | 0.44 | 179 | A1Vnn | Lisan al Shudja, Lingua Hydri |
| β Hya | β | | 301 | | 103192 | 57936 | 11^{h} 52^{m} 54.56^{s} | −33° 54′ 29.3″ | 4.29 | −0.96 | 365 | Ap Si | α^{2} CVn variable |
| η Hya | η | 7 | 49 | | 74280 | 42799 | 08^{h} 43^{m} 13.49^{s} | +03° 23′ 55.2″ | 4.30 | −1.48 | 466 | B3V... | Minazal II; β Cep variable |
| 12 Hya | D | 12 | 60 | | 74918 | 43067 | 08^{h} 46^{m} 22.53^{s} | −13° 32′ 51.7″ | 4.32 | 0.11 | 227 | G8III | |
| ρ Hya | ρ | 13 | 64 | | 75137 | 43234 | 08^{h} 48^{m} 25.98^{s} | +05° 50′ 16.4″ | 4.35 | −0.72 | 337 | A0Vn | Minazal IV |
| 58 Hya | E | 58 | 387 | | 130694 | 72571 | 14^{h} 50^{m} 17.47^{s} | −27° 57′ 36.8″ | 4.42 | −0.44 | 305 | K3III | Solitaire |
| σ Hya | σ | 5 | 42 | | 73471 | 42402 | 08^{h} 38^{m} 45.45^{s} | +03° 20′ 29.3″ | 4.45 | −0.72 | 352 | K2III | Minhar al Shija, Al Minliar al Shuja, Minchir |
| τ^{2} Hya | τ^{2} | 32 | 152 | | 82446 | 46776 | 09^{h} 31^{m} 58.93^{s} | −01° 11′ 04.8″ | 4.54 | −1.20 | 459 | A3V | Ukdah; Ukdah II |
| τ^{1} Hya | τ^{1} | 31 | 145 | | 81997 | 46509 | 09^{h} 29^{m} 08.84^{s} | −02° 46′ 08.2″ | 4.59 | 3.43 | 56 | F6V | Ukdah; Ukdah I |
| υ^{2} Hya | υ^{2} | 40 | 194 | | 87504 | 49402 | 10^{h} 05^{m} 07.49^{s} | −13° 03′ 52.8″ | 4.60 | −0.05 | 277 | B8V | |
| 31 Mon | F | (31) | 51 | | 74395 | 42835 | 08^{h} 43^{m} 40.38^{s} | −07° 14′ 01.4″ | 4.63 | −1.71 | 604 | G2Ib | |
| 2 Sex | | (2) | 168 | | 83425 | 47310 | 09^{h} 38^{m} 27.39^{s} | +04° 38′ 57.9″ | 4.68 | 0.06 | 274 | K3III | |
| ο Hya | ο | | 293 | | 101431 | 56922 | 11^{h} 40^{m} 12.82^{s} | −34° 44′ 40.8″ | 4.70 | −1.21 | 495 | B9V | |
| HD 81799 | G | | 141 | | 81799 | 46371 | 09^{h} 27^{m} 18.30^{s} | −22° 20′ 36.3″ | 4.72 | 1.06 | 176 | K1III | |
| HD 83953 | I | | 174 | | 83953 | 47522 | 09^{h} 41^{m} 17.03^{s} | −23° 35′ 29.5″ | 4.76 | −1.16 | 497 | B5V | |
| 26 Hya | | 26 | 122 | | 80499 | 45751 | 09^{h} 19^{m} 46.40^{s} | −11° 58′ 29.6″ | 4.77 | −0.19 | 320 | G8III | |
| 51 Hya | k | 51 | 375 | | 125932 | 70306 | 14^{h} 23^{m} 05.91^{s} | −27° 45′ 13.4″ | 4.78 | 1.14 | 175 | K3III | |
| 27 Hya | P | 27 | 124 | | 80586 | 45811 | 09^{h} 20^{m} 29.03^{s} | −09° 33′ 20.3″ | 4.80 | 0.43 | 243 | G8III-IV+... | unconfirmed planet? |
| 9 Hya | | 9 | 47 | | 74137 | 42662 | 08^{h} 41^{m} 43.33^{s} | −15° 56′ 35.3″ | 4.87 | 0.89 | 204 | K0IIICN... | |
| HD 85859 | | | 181 | | 85859 | 48559 | 09^{h} 54^{m} 12.44^{s} | −25° 55′ 56.9″ | 4.87 | −0.19 | 336 | K2III | |
| HD 92036 | | | 241 | | 92036 | 51979 | 10^{h} 37^{m} 13.80^{s} | −27° 24′ 45.7″ | 4.87 | −0.97 | 479 | M1III | |
| U Hya | | | 240 | U | 92055 | 52009 | 10^{h} 37^{m} 33.25^{s} | −13° 23′ 04.0″ | 4.89 | −1.16 | 528 | C | 240 G. Hya. Carbon star |
| φ Hya | φ, φ^{3} | | 242 | | 92214 | 52085 | 10^{h} 38^{m} 35.01^{s} | −16° 52′ 35.9″ | 4.91 | 0.72 | 225 | G8III | 242 G. Hya |
| χ^{1} Hya | χ^{1} | | 264 | | 96202 | 54204 | 11^{h} 05^{m} 20.03^{s} | −27° 17′ 36.9″ | 4.92 | 1.73 | 142 | F3IV/V | |
| HD 84117 | | | 175 | | 84117 | 47592 | 09^{h} 42^{m} 14.67^{s} | −23° 54′ 58.4″ | 4.93 | 4.07 | 49 | G0V | nearby |
| 17 Crt | | (17) | 284 | | 100286 | 56280 | 11^{h} 32^{m} 16.42^{s} | −29° 15′ 40.9″ | 4.93 | 2.80 | 87 | F8V | |
| HD 85951 | | | 183 | | 85951 | 48615 | 09^{h} 54^{m} 52.24^{s} | −19° 00′ 33.4″ | 4.94 | −1.74 | 706 | K5III | Felis |
| ψ Hya | ψ | 45 | 341 | | 114149 | 64166 | 13^{h} 09^{m} 03.28^{s} | −23° 07′ 04.7″ | 4.94 | 0.69 | 231 | K0III | |
| 52 Hya | l | 52 | 379 | | 126769 | 70753 | 14^{h} 28^{m} 10.44^{s} | −29° 29′ 29.7″ | 4.97 | −0.56 | 415 | B7/B8V | |
| 6 Hya | a | 6 | 44 | | 73840 | 42509 | 08^{h} 40^{m} 01.52^{s} | −12° 28′ 31.3″ | 4.98 | −0.57 | 419 | K3III | |
| ω Hya | ω | 18 | 95 | | 77996 | 44659 | 09^{h} 05^{m} 58.38^{s} | +05° 05′ 32.4″ | 4.99 | −2.86 | 1212 | K2II-III | |
| 160 G. Hya | | | 160 | | 82734 | 46880 | 09^{h} 33^{m} 12.47^{s} | −21° 06′ 56.7″ | 5.02 | −0.03 | 334 | K0III | |
| κ Hya | κ | 38 | 173 | | 83754 | 47452 | 09^{h} 40^{m} 18.38^{s} | −14° 19′ 56.1″ | 5.07 | −0.92 | 515 | B4IV/V | Al Sharāsīf |
| 50 Hya | | 50 | 370 | | 124206 | 69415 | 14^{h} 12^{m} 46.03^{s} | −27° 15′ 40.0″ | 5.07 | 0.83 | 229 | K2III | |
| 44 Hya | | 44 | 230 | | 91550 | 51718 | 10^{h} 34^{m} 00.89^{s} | −23° 44′ 42.8″ | 5.08 | −1.36 | 633 | K5III | |
| II Hya | | | 298 | | 102620 | 57613 | 11^{h} 48^{m} 45.11^{s} | −26° 44′ 59.1″ | 5.10 | −0.72 | 477 | M4III | |
| HD 100393 | | (18) | 287 | | 100393 | 56332 | 11^{h} 32^{m} 54.15^{s} | −31° 05′ 14.0″ | 5.13 | −0.58 | 453 | M1/M2III | 18 Crateris |
| 54 Hya | m | 54 | 382 | | 129926 | 72197 | 14^{h} 46^{m} 00.18^{s} | −25° 26′ 34.5″ | 5.15 | 2.73 | 99 | F0V + G/K | |
| HD 101666 | | (26) | 295 | | 101666 | 57047 | 11^{h} 41^{m} 43.95^{s} | −32° 29′ 57.6″ | 5.20 | −0.40 | 430 | K5III | 26 Crateris |
| 47 Hya | | 47 | 365 | | 121847 | 68269 | 13^{h} 58^{m} 31.18^{s} | −24° 58′ 19.8″ | 5.20 | 0.11 | 339 | B8V | |
| HD 94388 | b^{3} | (6) | 257 | | 94388 | 53252 | 10^{h} 53^{m} 29.48^{s} | −20° 08′ 17.3″ | 5.23 | 2.75 | 102 | F6V | 6 Crateris |
| 56 Hya | | 56 | 385 | | 130259 | 72357 | 14^{h} 47^{m} 44.78^{s} | −26° 05′ 14.9″ | 5.23 | 0.19 | 331 | G8/K0III | |
| 23 Hya | | 23 | 112 | | 79910 | 45527 | 09^{h} 16^{m} 41.72^{s} | −06° 21′ 11.4″ | 5.24 | 0.58 | 279 | K2III | |
| 303 G. Hya | | | 303 | | 103462 | 58082 | 11^{h} 54^{m} 42.51^{s} | −25° 42′ 50.6″ | 5.26 | 0.48 | 295 | G8III | |
| 61 G. Hya | | | 61 | | 74988 | 43142 | 08^{h} 47^{m} 15.01^{s} | −01° 53′ 49.4″ | 5.28 | 0.19 | 339 | A3V | |
| 14 Hya | | 14 | 67 | KX | 75333 | 43305 | 08^{h} 49^{m} 21.74^{s} | −03° 26′ 34.7″ | 5.30 | −0.34 | 438 | B9MNp... | KX Hya; α^{2} CVn variable |
| 200 G. Hya | | | 200 | | 88215 | 49809 | 10^{h} 10^{m} 05.96^{s} | −12° 48′ 56.4″ | 5.30 | 3.12 | 89 | F2/F3IV/V | |
| 1 G. Hya | | | 1 | | 68312 | 40107 | 08^{h} 11^{m} 33.03^{s} | −07° 46′ 20.9″ | 5.36 | 0.43 | 316 | G8III | |
| 142 G. Hya | | | 142 | | 81809 | 46404 | 09^{h} 27^{m} 46.92^{s} | −06° 04′ 15.7″ | 5.38 | 2.91 | 102 | G2V | |
| 328 G. Hya | | | 328 | | 109799 | 61621 | 12^{h} 37^{m} 42.23^{s} | −27° 08′ 19.2″ | 5.41 | 2.72 | 113 | F0V | |
| HD 96819 | | (10) | 271 | | 96819 | 54477 | 11^{h} 08^{m} 44.05^{s} | −28° 04′ 50.2″ | 5.43 | 1.61 | 189 | A1V | 10 Crateris |
| HD 93397 | b^{1} | (3) | 249 | | 93397 | 52737 | 10^{h} 46^{m} 52.06^{s} | −17° 17′ 48.6″ | 5.44 | 1.30 | 219 | A3V | 3 Crateris |
| 330 G. Hya | | | 330 | | 110666 | 62131 | 12^{h} 44^{m} 00.55^{s} | −28° 19′ 25.9″ | 5.46 | 0.03 | 397 | K3III | |
| 20 Hya | | 20 | 103 | | 78732 | 44961 | 09^{h} 09^{m} 35.58^{s} | −08° 47′ 15.5″ | 5.47 | −1.00 | 642 | G8II | |
| HD 122430 | | | 367 | | 122430 | 68581 | 14^{h} 02^{m} 22.80^{s} | −27° 25′ 47.1″ | 5.47 | −0.15 | 434 | K2/K3III | has a planet (b) |
| 24 Hya | | 24 | 114 | | 79931 | 45526 | 09^{h} 16^{m} 41.38^{s} | −08° 44′ 41.1″ | 5.49 | −1.14 | 689 | B9III | |
| 15 Hya | | 15 | 70 | | 75737 | 43496 | 08^{h} 51^{m} 34.44^{s} | −07° 10′ 38.0″ | 5.55 | −0.33 | 488 | A4m | |
| 33 Hya | A | 33 | 163 | | 82870 | 46982 | 09^{h} 34^{m} 32.64^{s} | −05° 54′ 53.3″ | 5.56 | −1.04 | 681 | K1III | Ukdah; Ukdah III |
| 323 G. Hya | | | 323 | | 108323 | 60735 | 12^{h} 26^{m} 51.69^{s} | −32° 49′ 48.2″ | 5.56 | −0.42 | 511 | B9V | |
| 224 G. Hya | | | 224 | | 90957 | 51364 | 10^{h} 29^{m} 29.01^{s} | −29° 39′ 49.9″ | 5.58 | 0.21 | 387 | K3III | |
| 195 G. Hya | | | 195 | | 87808 | 49569 | 10^{h} 07^{m} 09.49^{s} | −17° 08′ 29.7″ | 5.59 | 0.48 | 343 | K4III | |
| 225 G. Hya | | | 225 | | 91120 | 51491 | 10^{h} 30^{m} 59.86^{s} | −13° 35′ 18.5″ | 5.59 | −0.28 | 487 | B8/B9IV/V | |
| 2 Hya | | 2 | 23 | LM | 71297 | 41375 | 08^{h} 26^{m} 27.23^{s} | −03° 59′ 14.3″ | 5.60 | 1.97 | 173 | A5III-IV | LM Hya; δ Sct variable |
| 19 Hya | | 19 | 99 | | 78556 | 44883 | 09^{h} 08^{m} 42.19^{s} | −08° 35′ 22.2″ | 5.60 | −1.60 | 898 | B9.5III | |
| 28 Hya | | 28 | 134 | | 81420 | 46221 | 09^{h} 25^{m} 24.04^{s} | −05° 07′ 02.6″ | 5.60 | −0.98 | 675 | K5III | |
| 1 Hya | | 1 | 15 | | 70958 | 41211 | 08^{h} 24^{m} 35.14^{s} | −03° 45′ 04.2″ | 5.61 | 3.44 | 89 | F3V | |
| 55 Hya | | 55 | 384 | | 130158 | 72323 | 14^{h} 47^{m} 22.56^{s} | −25° 37′ 27.2″ | 5.61 | −0.76 | 613 | B9IV/V | |
| 92 G. Hya | | | 92 | | 77353 | 44356 | 09^{h} 01^{m} 58.02^{s} | −00° 28′ 58.2″ | 5.64 | −0.73 | 613 | K0III | |
| 333 G. Hya | | | 333 | | 111295 | 62500 | 12^{h} 48^{m} 26.36^{s} | −27° 35′ 50.0″ | 5.65 | 0.80 | 304 | G8III | |
| 59 Hya | | 59 | 92 | | 132219 | 73284 | 14^{h} 58^{m} 39.29^{s} | −27° 39′ 26.3″ | 5.65 | 0.50 | 350 | A6IV | |
| 148 G. Hya | | | 148 | | 82077 | 46511 | 09^{h} 29^{m} 12.65^{s} | −20° 44′ 56.9″ | 5.66 | −1.58 | 913 | K4/K5III | |
| χ^{2} Hya | χ^{2} | | 265 | | 96314 | 54255 | 11^{h} 05^{m} 57.55^{s} | −27° 17′ 16.1″ | 5.69 | −1.26 | 799 | B8V | 265 G. Hya.; β Lyr variable |
| 350 G. Hya | | | 350 | | 117716 | 66065 | 13^{h} 32^{m} 35.96^{s} | −28° 41′ 33.8″ | 5.69 | 1.61 | 214 | A0/A1V | |
| 56 G. Hya | | | 56 | | 74794 | 43026 | 08^{h} 46^{m} 02.45^{s} | −02° 02′ 55.6″ | 5.70 | 1.04 | 278 | K0III: | |
| 193 G. Hya | | | 193 | | 87427 | 49339 | 10^{h} 04^{m} 21.02^{s} | −24° 17′ 08.1″ | 5.70 | 1.23 | 255 | F0V | |
| 259 G. Hya | | | 259 | | 95221 | 53699 | 10^{h} 59^{m} 13.74^{s} | −33° 44′ 14.8″ | 5.70 | 2.27 | 159 | F2V | |
| 236 G. Hya | | | 236 | | 91889 | 51933 | 10^{h} 36^{m} 32.22^{s} | −12° 13′ 42.6″ | 5.71 | 3.76 | 80 | F7V | |
| HD 100893 | | (22) | 291 | | 100893 | 56620 | 11^{h} 36^{m} 34.92^{s} | −33° 34′ 11.9″ | 5.71 | 0.54 | 352 | K0III | 22 Crateris |
| 3 Hya | | 3 | 35 | HV | 72968 | 42146 | 08^{h} 35^{m} 28.21^{s} | −07° 58′ 56.4″ | 5.72 | 1.14 | 268 | A1spe... | HV Hya; α^{2} CVn variable |
| 107 G. Hya | | | 107 | | 79181 | 45158 | 09^{h} 11^{m} 58.77^{s} | −19° 44′ 51.9″ | 5.72 | 0.90 | 300 | G8III | |
| 102 G. Hya | | | 102 | | 78702 | 44923 | 09^{h} 09^{m} 04.25^{s} | −18° 19′ 43.0″ | 5.73 | 1.22 | 260 | A0/A1V | |
| 351 G. Hya | | | 351 | | 118349 | 66400 | 13^{h} 36^{m} 48.51^{s} | −26° 29′ 42.8″ | 5.73 | 0.36 | 386 | A7V+... | |
| 17 G. Hya | | | 17 | | 71095 | 41299 | 08^{h} 25^{m} 35.55^{s} | +02° 06′ 08.1″ | 5.74 | −0.59 | 601 | K5III | |
| 156 G. Hya | | | 156 | | 82573 | 46813 | 09^{h} 32^{m} 20.43^{s} | −19° 24′ 01.2″ | 5.74 | 0.58 | 351 | A4III | |
| 80 G. Hya | | | 80 | | 76376 | 43798 | 08^{h} 55^{m} 12.42^{s} | −18° 14′ 28.3″ | 5.75 | 0.17 | 425 | K2/K3III | |
| 101 G. Hya | | | 101 | | 78668 | 44936 | 09^{h} 09^{m} 11.50^{s} | −12° 21′ 27.7″ | 5.76 | 0.01 | 460 | G6III | |
| 57 Hya | | 57 | 386 | | 130274 | 72378 | 14^{h} 47^{m} 57.56^{s} | −26° 38′ 46.1″ | 5.76 | 0.14 | 434 | B9.5V | |
| 48 Hya | | 48 | 366 | | 122066 | 68390 | 14^{h} 00^{m} 00.25^{s} | −25° 00′ 36.6″ | 5.77 | 1.98 | 187 | F6V | |
| 121 G. Hya | | | 121 | | 80479 | 45743 | 09^{h} 19^{m} 33.11^{s} | −15° 50′ 04.3″ | 5.79 | 0.34 | 400 | K1/K2III | |
| 272 G. Hya | (β) | | 272 | | 97023 | 54561 | 11^{h} 09^{m} 53.38^{s} | −32° 22′ 02.8″ | 5.79 | 0.69 | 342 | A1V | also known as HR 4339 |
| 33 G. Hya | | | 33 | | 72660 | 42028 | 08^{h} 34^{m} 01.64^{s} | −02° 09′ 05.8″ | 5.80 | 0.80 | 326 | A1V | |
| 88 G. Hya | | | 88 | | 76932 | 44075 | 08^{h} 58^{m} 43.78^{s} | −16° 07′ 59.7″ | 5.80 | 4.16 | 70 | F7/F8IV/V | |
| 354 G. Hya | | | 354 | | 118646 | 66563 | 13^{h} 38^{m} 42.13^{s} | −29° 33′ 38.4″ | 5.81 | 2.36 | 160 | F3V | |
| 357 G. Hya | | | 357 | | 119752 | 67143 | 13^{h} 45^{m} 36.94^{s} | −26° 06′ 57.5″ | 5.81 | 1.08 | 287 | A0V | |
| 118 G. Hya | | | 118 | | 80050 | 45559 | 09^{h} 17^{m} 07.73^{s} | −14° 34′ 26.6″ | 5.83 | 0.44 | 389 | K0III | |
| 60 Hya | | 60 | 393 | | 132851 | 73566 | 15^{h} 02^{m} 06.38^{s} | −28° 03′ 37.9″ | 5.83 | 0.84 | 325 | A4IV | |
| 300 G. Hya | | | 300 | | 103026 | 57841 | 11^{h} 51^{m} 41.62^{s} | −30° 50′ 02.7″ | 5.85 | 3.36 | 102 | F8V | |
| 150 G. Hya | | | 150 | | 82232 | 46618 | 09^{h} 30^{m} 22.54^{s} | −15° 34′ 37.9″ | 5.86 | 1.45 | 249 | K2III | |
| 329 G. Hya | | | 329 | | 109960 | 61720 | 12^{h} 39^{m} 03.48^{s} | −30° 25′ 20.5″ | 5.86 | −0.26 | 547 | K2/K3III | |
| 252 G. Hya | | | 252 | | 93657 | 52841 | 10^{h} 48^{m} 14.13^{s} | −31° 41′ 16.3″ | 5.87 | 0.29 | 426 | A1V | |
| 374 G. Hya | | | 374 | | 125276 | 69965 | 14^{h} 19^{m} 01.13^{s} | −25° 48′ 58.7″ | 5.87 | 4.62 | 58 | F7Vw | |
| HD 72561 | | | 32 | | 72561 | 42008 | 08^{h} 33^{m} 43.49^{s} | +04° 45′ 25.3″ | 5.89 | −5.22 | 5433 | G5III | |
| 14 G. Hya | | | 14 | | 70652 | 41080 | 08^{h} 22^{m} 54.10^{s} | −07° 32′ 35.3″ | 5.92 | −1.11 | 832 | M1III | |
| 162 G. Hya | | | 162 | | 82747 | 46897 | 09^{h} 33^{m} 26.10^{s} | −22° 51′ 50.5″ | 5.92 | 1.12 | 297 | B9.5V | |
| HD 103596 | | | 304 | | 103596 | 58158 | 11^{h} 55^{m} 40.13^{s} | −28° 28′ 37.3″ | 5.93 | 0.11 | 477 | K4III | 29 Crateris |
| 84 G. Hya | | | 84 | | 76579 | 43899 | 08^{h} 56^{m} 34.13^{s} | −16° 42′ 31.3″ | 5.95 | −0.82 | 738 | K3III | |
| 158 G. Hya | | | 158 | | 82660 | 46859 | 09^{h} 32^{m} 55.78^{s} | −13° 31′ 00.5″ | 5.95 | −1.06 | 823 | K4III | |
| HD 100623 | | (20) | 289 | | 100623 | 56452 | 11^{h} 34^{m} 29.95^{s} | −32° 50′ 00.0″ | 5.96 | 6.06 | 31 | K0V | 20 Crateris |
| 27 G. Hya | | | 27 | | 71766 | 41597 | 08^{h} 28^{m} 51.01^{s} | −09° 44′ 54.9″ | 6.01 | −1.39 | 985 | F2III | |
| HD 76151 | | | 75 | | 76151 | 43726 | 08^{h} 54^{m} 18.19^{s} | −05° 26′ 04.3″ | 6.01 | 4.85 | 56 | G3V | |
| 136 G. Hya | | | 136 | | 81567 | 46288 | 09^{h} 26^{m} 22.31^{s} | −01° 27′ 50.6″ | 6.01 | −1.14 | 876 | K3III | |
| 209 G. Hya | | | 209 | | 89455 | 50536 | 10^{h} 19^{m} 16.88^{s} | −12° 31′ 41.2″ | 6.01 | 1.89 | 217 | A8III | |
| φ^{2} Hya | φ^{2} | | 234 | | 91880 | 51905 | 10^{h} 36^{m} 16.68^{s} | −16° 20′ 39.6″ | 6.01 | −1.35 | 967 | M1III | |
| 16 G. Hya | | | 16 | | 70937 | 41214 | 08^{h} 24^{m} 36.42^{s} | −04° 43′ 00.7″ | 6.03 | 1.98 | 211 | F2V | |
| 6 G. Hya | | | 6 | | 70013 | 40818 | 08^{h} 19^{m} 49.85^{s} | +03° 56′ 53.1″ | 6.04 | −0.21 | 579 | G8III | |
| 227 G. Hya | | | 227 | | 91280 | 51551 | 10^{h} 31^{m} 48.73^{s} | −28° 14′ 13.5″ | 6.04 | 2.90 | 138 | F6/F7V | |
| 243 G. Hya | | | 243 | | 92245 | 52113 | 10^{h} 38^{m} 50.44^{s} | −12° 26′ 37.1″ | 6.04 | 0.83 | 359 | A0Vn | |
| 361 G. Hya | | | 361 | | 121156 | 67890 | 13^{h} 54^{m} 16.75^{s} | −28° 34′ 09.9″ | 6.05 | 2.04 | 206 | K2III | |
| 260 G. Hya | | | 260 | | 95456 | 53818 | 11^{h} 00^{m} 40.84^{s} | −31° 50′ 22.6″ | 6.06 | 3.59 | 102 | F8V | |
| 90 G. Hya | | | 90 | | 77250 | 44315 | 09^{h} 01^{m} 31.40^{s} | +05° 38′ 27.6″ | 6.08 | −0.84 | 789 | F3IV+... | |
| 179 G. Hya | | | 179 | | 85519 | 48396 | 09^{h} 51^{m} 59.53^{s} | −16° 32′ 04.6″ | 6.08 | 0.66 | 395 | K0III | |
| 65 G. Hya | | | 65 | | 75140 | 43204 | 08^{h} 48^{m} 04.87^{s} | −06° 33′ 31.5″ | 6.09 | −0.46 | 667 | K0 | |
| 322 G. Hya | | | 322 | | 108110 | 60603 | 12^{h} 25^{m} 18.41^{s} | −27° 44′ 56.4″ | 6.09 | −0.38 | 643 | K3III | |
| 21 Hya | | 21 | 106 | KW | 79193 | 45184 | 09^{h} 12^{m} 26.05^{s} | −07° 06′ 35.6″ | 6.10 | 1.51 | 269 | A3m | KW Hya; Algol variable |
| 231 G. Hya | | | 231 | | 91706 | 51795 | 10^{h} 34^{m} 57.76^{s} | −23° 10′ 34.8″ | 6.10 | 2.09 | 207 | F6V | |
| 372 G. Hya | | | 372 | | 124576 | 69623 | 14^{h} 15^{m} 01.28^{s} | −29° 16′ 54.7″ | 6.10 | −0.54 | 695 | A1V | |
| 155 G. Hya | | | 155 | | 82543 | 46840 | 09^{h} 32^{m} 41.41^{s} | +01° 51′ 51.3″ | 6.11 | 0.58 | 416 | F7IV-V | |
| OY Hya (188 G. Hya) | | | 188 | OY | 86612 | 48943 | 09^{h} 59^{m} 06.32^{s} | −23° 57′ 02.8″ | 6.11 | −0.31 | 628 | B5V | Be star |
| 9 G. Hya | | | 9 | | 70148 | 40859 | 08^{h} 20^{m} 17.01^{s} | −05° 19′ 47.4″ | 6.12 | 0.12 | 516 | K2III | |
| 73 G. Hya | | | 73 | | 75916 | 43580 | 08^{h} 52^{m} 30.74^{s} | −13° 13′ 58.6″ | 6.12 | 1.04 | 338 | K1III | |
| 154 G. Hya | | | 154 | | 82477 | 46768 | 09^{h} 31^{m} 55.77^{s} | −10° 22′ 13.4″ | 6.12 | 0.92 | 358 | K0 | |
| 157 G. Hya | | | 157 | | 82638 | 46869 | 09^{h} 33^{m} 02.00^{s} | −08° 30′ 19.0″ | 6.12 | 0.72 | 393 | K0 | |
| 217 G. Hya | | | 217 | | 89911 | 50790 | 10^{h} 22^{m} 12.96^{s} | −19° 51′ 59.7″ | 6.12 | −0.55 | 704 | A0V | |
| 10 Hya | | 10 | 52 | | 74591 | 42931 | 08^{h} 45^{m} 01.28^{s} | +05° 40′ 50.1″ | 6.13 | 2.12 | 207 | A6V | |
| 81 G. Hya | | | 81 | | 76494 | 43902 | 08^{h} 56^{m} 37.04^{s} | +04° 14′ 11.7″ | 6.13 | −1.34 | 1016 | G8II-III | |
| 153 G. Hya | | | 153 | | 82428 | 46744 | 09^{h} 31^{m} 38.97^{s} | −10° 33′ 07.1″ | 6.13 | 2.46 | 177 | F0Vn | |
| 13 G. Hya | | | 13 | | 70574 | 41036 | 08^{h} 22^{m} 30.20^{s} | −06° 10′ 45.0″ | 6.14 | 2.07 | 212 | A8IV | |
| 105 G. Hya | | | 105 | | 79108 | 45167 | 09^{h} 12^{m} 12.91^{s} | +03° 52′ 01.2″ | 6.14 | 0.83 | 376 | A0V | |
| 146 G. Hya | | | 146 | | 82043 | 46529 | 09^{h} 29^{m} 24.47^{s} | −02° 12′ 18.6″ | 6.14 | 0.32 | 475 | F0III | |
| MO Hya | | | 334 | MO | 111786 | 62788 | 12^{h} 51^{m} 57.97^{s} | −26° 44′ 18.1″ | 6.14 | 2.24 | 196 | A0III | δ Sct variable |
| 363 G. Hya | | | 363 | | 121699 | 68177 | 13^{h} 57^{m} 27.75^{s} | −23° 01′ 21.5″ | 6.14 | −0.17 | 596 | K2/K3III | |
| HD 100307 | | | 286 | | 100307 | 56293 | 11^{h} 32^{m} 23.34^{s} | −26° 44′ 48.7″ | 6.15 | −0.59 | 728 | M2III | |
| NS Hya | | | 96 | NS | 78196 | 44738 | 09^{h} 06^{m} 59.95^{s} | +01° 27′ 45.8″ | 6.16 | −1.25 | 991 | M1III | |
| 315 G. Hya | | | 315 | | 105686 | 59307 | 12^{h} 10^{m} 02.58^{s} | −34° 42′ 17.0″ | 6.16 | 1.14 | 329 | A0V | |
| 302 G. Hya | | | 302 | | 103266 | 57971 | 11^{h} 53^{m} 26.87^{s} | −35° 03′ 59.7″ | 6.17 | 1.78 | 246 | A2V | |
| 8 G. Hya | | | 8 | | 70110 | 40858 | 08^{h} 20^{m} 12.98^{s} | −00° 54′ 32.8″ | 6.18 | 3.13 | 133 | F9V | |
| 37 G. Hya | | | 37 | | 73281 | 42299 | 08^{h} 37^{m} 27.17^{s} | −04° 56′ 02.4″ | 6.18 | 0.79 | 391 | K0 | |
| 89 G. Hya | | | 89 | | 77084 | 44162 | 08^{h} 59^{m} 39.94^{s} | −19° 12′ 28.1″ | 6.19 | 3.20 | 129 | F5IV/V | |
| 359 G. Hya | | | 359 | | 120455 | 67523 | 13^{h} 50^{m} 06.54^{s} | −29° 04′ 52.5″ | 6.19 | 0.97 | 361 | A0V | |
| LV Hya | | | 305 | LV | 103789 | 58272 | 11^{h} 57^{m} 03.78^{s} | −33° 18′ 55.6″ | 6.20 | 0.88 | 378 | B9.5V | α^{2} CVn variable |
| HD 95698 | | (8) | 261 | | 95698 | 53963 | 11^{h} 02^{m} 24.41^{s} | −26° 49′ 52.3″ | 6.21 | 2.59 | 173 | A9III/IV | 8 Crateris |
| 356 G. Hya | | | 356 | | 119623 | 67071 | 13^{h} 44^{m} 45.70^{s} | −25° 30′ 03.2″ | 6.21 | −0.47 | 706 | K3III | |
| 58 G. Hya | | | 58 | | 74860 | 43035 | 08^{h} 46^{m} 06.89^{s} | −11° 00′ 24.5″ | 6.22 | −4.13 | 3835 | K5III | |
| 182 G. Hya | | | 182 | | 85905 | 48584 | 09^{h} 54^{m} 31.83^{s} | −22° 29′ 14.8″ | 6.23 | 0.50 | 457 | A2/A3III | |
| 205 G. Hya | | | 205 | | 88699 | 50066 | 10^{h} 13^{m} 19.48^{s} | −27° 01′ 44.3″ | 6.23 | 0.74 | 409 | A9m... | |
| 311 G. Hya | | | 311 | | 105078 | 59008 | 12^{h} 05^{m} 56.69^{s} | −35° 41′ 38.2″ | 6.23 | −0.51 | 728 | B7V | |
| 371 G. Hya | | | 371 | | 124281 | 69458 | 14^{h} 13^{m} 13.25^{s} | −26° 36′ 44.2″ | 6.23 | −0.46 | 709 | K0III | |
| 199 G. Hya | | | 199 | | 88182 | 49802 | 10^{h} 09^{m} 56.49^{s} | −12° 05′ 42.9″ | 6.24 | 1.74 | 259 | A5m | |
| 245 G. Hya | | | 245 | | 92770 | 52391 | 10^{h} 42^{m} 31.38^{s} | −13° 58′ 28.4″ | 6.24 | −0.53 | 738 | K3/K4III: | |
| 147 G. Hya | | | 147 | | 82074 | 46543 | 09^{h} 29^{m} 32.43^{s} | −04° 14′ 47.4″ | 6.25 | 2.57 | 177 | G6IV | |
| 159 G. Hya | | | 159 | | 82674 | 46893 | 09^{h} 33^{m} 19.94^{s} | −07° 11′ 24.5″ | 6.25 | 0.70 | 421 | K0 | |
| 197 G. Hya | | | 197 | | 88025 | 49689 | 10^{h} 08^{m} 35.45^{s} | −15° 36′ 43.0″ | 6.25 | 0.01 | 578 | A0V | |
| 149 G. Hya | | | 149 | | 82180 | 46569 | 09^{h} 29^{m} 49.88^{s} | −23° 20′ 43.2″ | 6.26 | −2.26 | 1646 | K2/K3III | |
| 144 G. Hya | | | 144 | | 81980 | 46504 | 09^{h} 29^{m} 02.34^{s} | −01° 15′ 24.9″ | 6.27 | 1.47 | 297 | F0Vn | |
| 185 G. Hya | | | 185 | | 86266 | 48763 | 09^{h} 56^{m} 46.89^{s} | −26° 32′ 59.1″ | 6.27 | 2.06 | 227 | A4V | |
| 391 G. Hya | | | 391 | | 131919 | 73171 | 14^{h} 57^{m} 13.72^{s} | −29° 09′ 27.4″ | 6.28 | 0.12 | 557 | B8/B9V | |
| 235 G. Hya | | | 235 | | 91881 | 51885 | 10^{h} 36^{m} 04.51^{s} | −26° 40′ 31.0″ | 6.29 | 3.07 | 143 | F5V | |
| 126 G. Hya | | | 126 | | 80719 | 45854 | 09^{h} 20^{m} 55.46^{s} | −15° 37′ 03.2″ | 6.30 | 2.88 | 158 | F6V | |
| 192 G. Hya | | | 192 | | 87344 | 49321 | 10^{h} 04^{m} 02.83^{s} | −18° 06′ 05.1″ | 6.30 | 0.47 | 477 | B8V | |
| HQ Hya | | | 7 | HQ | 69997 | 40766 | 08^{h} 19^{m} 15.11^{s} | −10° 09′ 57.0″ | 6.31 | 1.14 | 353 | F3IIIp | δ Sct variable |
| 37 Hya | | 37 | 171 | OW | 83650 | 47427 | 09^{h} 39^{m} 47.42^{s} | −10° 34′ 13.0″ | 6.31 | −1.33 | 1098 | A0Vn | OW Hya; 171 G. Hya. |
| 337 G. Hya | | | 337 | | 112519 | 63243 | 12^{h} 57^{m} 33.17^{s} | −22° 45′ 12.5″ | 6.31 | 0.83 | 407 | K0III | |
| 111 G. Hya | | | 111 | | 79752 | 45424 | 09^{h} 15^{m} 24.95^{s} | −15° 01′ 29.5″ | 6.32 | 1.18 | 348 | A0V | |
| HD 100953 | | (23) | 292 | | 100953 | 56657 | 11^{h} 37^{m} 01.22^{s} | −32° 59′ 16.8″ | 6.32 | 2.04 | 234 | F5V | 23 Crateris |
| 165 G. Hya | | | 165 | | 83104 | 47070 | 09^{h} 35^{m} 33.82^{s} | −19° 34′ 59.9″ | 6.33 | 1.63 | 283 | A0V | |
| 71 G. Hya | | | 71 | | 75811 | 43570 | 08^{h} 52^{m} 24.18^{s} | +05° 20′ 25.2″ | 6.34 | 0.22 | 547 | A5V | |
| 104 G. Hya | | | 104 | | 79066 | 45150 | 09^{h} 11^{m} 55.69^{s} | +05° 28′ 07.2″ | 6.34 | 2.81 | 166 | A9IVe... | |
| V335 Hya | | | 316 | V335 | 106198 | 59588 | 12^{h} 13^{m} 12.97^{s} | −34° 07′ 31.0″ | 6.34 | −0.89 | 911 | M4/M5Ib/II: | |
| 317 G. Hya | | | 317 | | 106257 | 59622 | 12^{h} 13^{m} 36.80^{s} | −33° 47′ 34.4″ | 6.34 | 0.86 | 406 | A0V | |
| 34 G. Hya | | | 34 | | 72908 | 42142 | 08^{h} 35^{m} 24.96^{s} | +02° 44′ 36.4″ | 6.35 | 0.21 | 551 | G9III | |
| 275 G. Hya | | | 275 | | 97393 | 54725 | 11^{h} 12^{m} 14.78^{s} | −32° 26′ 01.8″ | 6.35 | −0.23 | 676 | M2/M3III | |
| 369 G. Hya | | | 369 | | 124162 | 69398 | 14^{h} 12^{m} 24.55^{s} | −24° 21′ 48.0″ | 6.35 | 0.49 | 484 | K2III | |
| 373 G. Hya | | | 373 | | 125279 | 69977 | 14^{h} 19^{m} 07.17^{s} | −27° 08′ 28.2″ | 6.35 | −0.69 | 834 | K5III | |
| 206 G. Hya | | | 206 | | 88806 | 50142 | 10^{h} 14^{m} 08.98^{s} | −23° 48′ 50.3″ | 6.36 | −1.70 | 1336 | M1III | |
| 50 G. Hya | | | 50 | | 74393 | 42854 | 08^{h} 43^{m} 59.79^{s} | +04° 20′ 04.5″ | 6.37 | −0.40 | 738 | B9.5III-IV | |
| 172 G. Hya | | | 172 | | 83731 | 47454 | 09^{h} 40^{m} 20.07^{s} | −10° 46′ 09.1″ | 6.37 | −0.68 | 838 | A2V | |
| 29 G. Hya | | | 29 | | 72462 | 41893 | 08^{h} 32^{m} 33.39^{s} | −15° 01′ 48.7″ | 6.38 | 2.13 | 231 | A7IV/V | |
| 320 G. Hya | | | 320 | | 107869 | 60468 | 12^{h} 23^{m} 47.82^{s} | −30° 20′ 07.4″ | 6.39 | −0.57 | 803 | K5III | |
| 34 Hya | | 34 | 167 | | 83373 | 47249 | 09^{h} 37^{m} 51.54^{s} | −09° 25′ 28.1″ | 6.40 | 1.10 | 375 | A1V | |
| R Hya | | | 347 | R | 117287 | 65835 | 13^{h} 29^{m} 42.82^{s} | −23° 16′ 52.9″ | 6.40 | −2.55 | 2012 | M6/M7e | Mira variable |
| 55 G. Hya | | | 55 | | 74688 | 42951 | 08^{h} 45^{m} 20.77^{s} | −02° 36′ 03.7″ | 6.41 | 1.71 | 283 | F2+... | |
| LO Hya (25 G. Hya) | | | 25 | LO | 71663 | 41564 | 08^{h} 28^{m} 29.16^{s} | −02° 31′ 01.6″ | 6.42 | 1.77 | 278 | A5m | |
| 66 G. Hya | | | 66 | | 75217 | 43246 | 08^{h} 48^{m} 37.48^{s} | −01° 02′ 41.4″ | 6.42 | 0.68 | 458 | K0 | |
| 308 G. Hya | | | 308 | | 104039 | 58436 | 11^{h} 58^{m} 54.39^{s} | −25° 54′ 31.7″ | 6.42 | −0.76 | 891 | A1IV/V | |
| 364 G. Hya | | | 364 | | 121758 | 68224 | 13^{h} 57^{m} 58.86^{s} | −25° 59′ 53.1″ | 6.42 | 0.17 | 579 | K1III | |
| 26 G. Hya | | | 26 | | 71665 | 41547 | 08^{h} 28^{m} 19.78^{s} | −08° 48′ 58.3″ | 6.43 | −0.65 | 849 | K0 | |
| 74 G. Hya | | | 74 | | 76027 | 43623 | 08^{h} 53^{m} 05.35^{s} | −16° 57′ 08.5″ | 6.43 | 0.89 | 417 | K1III | |
| 274 G. Hya | | | 274 | | 97344 | 54703 | 11^{h} 11^{m} 57.86^{s} | −26° 48′ 22.1″ | 6.43 | 0.84 | 427 | K0III | |
| 332 G. Hya | | | 332 | | 111226 | 62448 | 12^{h} 47^{m} 53.67^{s} | −24° 51′ 06.3″ | 6.43 | −0.66 | 853 | B8V | |
| 360 G. Hya | | | 360 | | 120690 | 67620 | 13^{h} 51^{m} 20.70^{s} | −24° 23′ 23.2″ | 6.43 | 4.93 | 65 | G5V | |
| 263 G. Hya | | | 263 | | 95857 | 54030 | 11^{h} 03^{m} 16.09^{s} | −31° 57′ 38.8″ | 6.44 | −0.38 | 753 | M2/M3III | |
| 279 G. Hya | | | 279 | | 98221 | 55164 | 11^{h} 17^{m} 38.88^{s} | −34° 44′ 14.3″ | 6.44 | 3.09 | 152 | F3V | |
| 281 G. Hya | | | 281 | | 99712 | 55953 | 11^{h} 27^{m} 58.67^{s} | −35° 19′ 43.9″ | 6.44 | −1.50 | 1264 | K4/K5III | |
| 294 G. Hya | | | 294 | | 101563 | 57001 | 11^{h} 41^{m} 08.60^{s} | −29° 11′ 48.6″ | 6.44 | 3.35 | 135 | G2III/IV | |
| 54 G. Hya | | | 54 | | 74685 | 42981 | 08^{h} 45^{m} 34.84^{s} | +04° 39′ 52.4″ | 6.45 | 0.93 | 414 | K0 | |
| 117 G. Hya | | | 117 | | 79994 | 45543 | 09^{h} 16^{m} 57.05^{s} | −11° 06′ 10.6″ | 6.45 | 1.19 | 368 | K0 | |
| 166 G. Hya | | | 166 | | 83352 | 47242 | 09^{h} 37^{m} 45.94^{s} | −03° 10′ 14.2″ | 6.45 | 0.74 | 452 | K0 | |
| 204 G. Hya | | | 204 | | 88595 | 50013 | 10^{h} 12^{m} 38.10^{s} | −19° 09′ 10.1″ | 6.45 | 3.33 | 137 | F7V | |
| 258 G. Hya | | | 258 | | 94619 | 53387 | 10^{h} 55^{m} 11.58^{s} | −20° 39′ 53.9″ | 6.45 | 0.00 | 637 | K1III | |
| 349 G. Hya | | | 349 | | 117718 | 66060 | 13^{h} 32^{m} 34.52^{s} | −29° 33′ 55.0″ | 6.45 | 3.08 | 154 | F5IV | |
| 48 G. Hya | | | 48 | | 74190 | 42701 | 08^{h} 42^{m} 09.83^{s} | −11° 57′ 57.5″ | 6.46 | 1.13 | 379 | A5m | |
| 109 G. Hya | | | 109 | | 79481 | 45305 | 09^{h} 14^{m} 03.09^{s} | −14° 41′ 41.3″ | 6.46 | 0.26 | 567 | G6/G8III/IV | |
| 325 G. Hya | | | 325 | | 109074 | 61172 | 12^{h} 32^{m} 04.40^{s} | −32° 32′ 01.4″ | 6.46 | 0.25 | 568 | A3V | |
| 82 G. Hya | | | 82 | | 76478 | 43850 | 08^{h} 55^{m} 54.49^{s} | −15° 26′ 22.0″ | 6.47 | −0.51 | 813 | K2III | |
| 213 G. Hya | | | 213 | | 89816 | 50728 | 10^{h} 21^{m} 28.70^{s} | −23° 42′ 39.2″ | 6.47 | 1.18 | 373 | A4IV/V | |
| 270 G. Hya | | | 270 | | 96723 | 54430 | 11^{h} 08^{m} 15.77^{s} | −29° 58′ 20.8″ | 6.47 | 0.74 | 457 | A1V | |
| 3 G. Hya | | | 3 | | 68667 | 40263 | 08^{h} 13^{m} 21.79^{s} | −01° 09′ 57.2″ | 6.48 | 0.47 | 519 | K0 | |
| 63 G. Hya | | | 63 | | 75098 | 43152 | 08^{h} 47^{m} 21.48^{s} | −17° 03′ 10.3″ | 6.48 | −0.36 | 762 | A2V | |
| 100 G. Hya | | | 100 | | 78614 | 44888 | 09^{h} 08^{m} 44.52^{s} | −16° 16′ 37.8″ | 6.48 | 1.07 | 394 | K0IIICN... | |
| 297 G. Hya | | | 297 | | 102438 | 57507 | 11^{h} 47^{m} 15.99^{s} | −30° 17′ 09.4″ | 6.48 | 5.23 | 58 | G5V | |
| 299 G. Hya | | | 299 | | 102888 | 57749 | 11^{h} 50^{m} 37.24^{s} | −27° 16′ 40.6″ | 6.48 | 0.57 | 495 | G8III | |
| 348 G. Hya | | | 348 | | 117558 | 65969 | 13^{h} 31^{m} 33.22^{s} | −28° 06′ 45.9″ | 6.48 | 1.78 | 284 | A1V | |
| 378 G. Hya | | | 378 | | 126400 | 70538 | 14^{h} 25^{m} 47.77^{s} | −26° 51′ 07.6″ | 6.48 | 2.05 | 251 | K0III | |
| 233 G. Hya | | | 233 | | 91790 | 51852 | 10^{h} 35^{m} 38.86^{s} | −18° 34′ 08.4″ | 6.49 | 2.20 | 235 | A5IV/V | |
| 312 G. Hya | | | 312 | | 105113 | 59021 | 12^{h} 06^{m} 05.25^{s} | −32° 57′ 38.7″ | 6.49 | 2.94 | 167 | G0V | |
| 342 G. Hya | | | 342 | | 114576 | 64375 | 13^{h} 11^{m} 39.24^{s} | −26° 33′ 06.2″ | 6.49 | 1.23 | 367 | A5V | |
| 346 G. Hya | | | 346 | | 117033 | 65682 | 13^{h} 28^{m} 01.88^{s} | −26° 24′ 08.0″ | 6.49 | −1.12 | 1087 | K5III | |
| 210 G. Hya | | | 210 | | 89747 | 50693 | 10^{h} 21^{m} 07.98^{s} | −17° 59′ 05.6″ | 6.50 | 2.68 | 189 | F3IV | |
| 318 G. Hya | | | 218 | | 106500 | 59742 | 12^{h} 15^{m} 06.42^{s} | −29° 14′ 13.9″ | 6.50 | 0.75 | 461 | K0III | |
| HD 96700 | | | 269 | | 96700 | 54400 | 11^{h} 07^{m} 54^{s} | −30° 10′ 28″ | 6.50 | | 83 | G0V | have two planets (b and c) |
| 29 Hya | | 29 | 139 | | 81728 | 46365 | 09^{h} 27^{m} 14.65^{s} | −09° 13′ 25.3″ | 6.53 | −1.48 | 1304 | A2V | |
| HD 82943 | | | 164 | | 82943 | 47007 | 09^{h} 34^{m} 50.74^{s} | −12° 07′ 46.4″ | 6.54 | 4.35 | 90 | G0V | has three planets (b, c & d) |
| HD 94046 | b^{2} | (5) | | | 94046 | 53037 | 10^{h} 51^{m} 05.99^{s} | −18° 19′ 56.0″ | 6.56 | 0.76 | 471 | A3V | 5 Crateris |
| 17 Hya | | 17 | 79 | | 76370 | 43822 | 08^{h} 55^{m} 29.60^{s} | −07° 58′ 16.0″ | 6.67 | 1.72 | 319 | A3 | |
| 14 Lib | | (14) | | | 131992 | 73189 | 14^{h} 57^{m} 31.96^{s} | −25° 26′ 30.4″ | 6.95 | 1.56 | 391 | A2/A3V | |
| HD 90156 | (γ) | | | | 90156 | 50921 | 10^{h} 23^{m} 55.27^{s} | −29° 38′ 43.9″ | 6.95 | 5.23 | 72 | G5V | has a planet (b); variable star |
| V Hya | | | | V | | 53085 | 10^{h} 51^{m} 37.26^{s} | −21° 15′ 00.0″ | 7.0 | | | C | Carbon star |
| 25 Hya | | 25 | | | 80105 | 45588 | 09^{h} 17^{m} 29.22^{s} | −11° 57′ 42.7″ | 7.07 | 1.50 | 424 | K0 | |
| HD 86264 | | | | | 86264 | 48780 | 09^{h} 56^{m} 57.84^{s} | −15° 53′ 42.4″ | 7.42 | 3.12 | 237 | F7V | has a planet (b) |
| HD 86950 | | | | | 86950 | 49129 | 10^{h} 01^{m} 38.0^{s} | −17° 19′ 59″ | 7.46 | | 551 | K1 III | has a planet |
| HD 72659 | | | | | 72659 | 42030 | 08^{h} 34^{m} 03.19^{s} | −01° 34′ 05.6″ | 7.48 | 3.93 | 168 | G0 | has a planet (b) |
| HD 74156 | | | | | 74156 | 42723 | 08^{h} 42^{m} 25.12^{s} | +04° 34′ 41.2″ | 7.62 | 3.57 | 211 | G0V | has three planets (b, c, & unconfirmed d) |
| φ^{1} Hya | φ^{1} | 43 | | | 91369 | 51614 | 10^{h} 32^{m} 41.17^{s} | −16° 57′ 30.7″ | 7.62 | 3.25 | 244 | G2V | |
| HD 86226 | | | | | 86226 | 48739 | 09^{h} 56^{m} 29.84^{s} | −24° 05′ 57.8″ | 7.93 | 4.79 | 139 | G2V | has a planet (b) |
| HD 128356 | | | | | 128356 | 71481 | 14^{h} 37^{m} 05.0^{s} | −25° 48′ 09″ | 8.29 | | 85 | K3V | has a planet |
| V478 Hya | | | | V478 | 70573 | | 08^{h} 22^{m} 49.95^{s} | +01° 51′ 33.6″ | 8.70 | 5.40 | 149 | G1-1.5V | has a planet (b) |
| HD 72892 | | | | | 72892 | 42098 | 08^{h} 34^{m} 53.0^{s} | −14° 27′ 24″ | 8.83 | | 237 | G5V | has a planet |
| WASP-166 | | | | | | | 09^{h} 39^{m} 30.0^{s} | −20° 58′ 57″ | 9.36 | | 369 | F9 | has a transiting planet |
| Gliese 433 | | | | | | 56528 | 11^{h} 35^{m} 26.95^{s} | −32° 32′ 23.9″ | 9.79 | 10.01 | 29 | M1.5 | has a planet (b) |
| WASP-51/HAT-P-30 | | | | | | | 08^{h} 15^{m} 48^{s} | +05° 50′ 12″ | 10.42 | | 629 | F | has a transiting planet |
| GJ 357 | | | | | | 47101 | 09^{h} 36^{m} 01.64^{s} | −21° 39′ 38.9″ | 10.91 | 11.13 | 31 | M2.5V | has three transiting planets (d) |
| TW Hya | | | | TW | | 53911 | 11^{h} 01^{m} 51.91^{s} | −34° 42′ 17.0″ | 11.1 | 7.3 | 184 | K8Ve | T Tauri star, retracted planet |
| WASP-25 | | | | | | | 13^{h} 01^{m} 26.37^{s} | −27° 31′ 19.9″ | 11.87 | 5.74 | 550 | G4 | has a transiting planet |
| WASP-175 | | | | | | | 11^{h} 05^{m} 17.0^{s} | −34° 07′ 20″ | 12 | | 1905 | | has a transiting planet |
| HAT-P-42 | | | | | | | 09^{h} 01^{m} 23.0^{s} | +06° 05′ 50″ | 12.17 | | 1458 | | Lerna; has a transiting planet |
| WASP-169 | | | | | | | 08^{h} 29^{m} 33.0^{s} | −12° 56′ 41″ | 12.2 | | 2081 | | has a transiting planet |
| WASP-142 | | | | | | | 09^{h} 22^{m} 02.0^{s} | −23° 56′ 46″ | 12.3 | | 2740 | F8 | has a transiting planet |
| HAT-P-35 | | | | | | | 08^{h} 13^{m} 00^{s} | +04° 47′ 13″ | 12.46 | | 1745 | | has a transiting planet |
| WASP-143 | | | | | | | 09^{h} 23^{m} 23.0^{s} | +02° 55′ 57″ | 12.6 | | 1115 | G1 | has a transiting planet |
| WASP-36 | | | | | | | 08^{h} 45^{m} 9.0^{s} | −08° 01′ 37″ | 12.7 | | 1468 | G2 | has a transiting planet |
| LHS 3003 | | | | | | | 14^{h} 56^{m} 38.314^{s} | −28° 09′ 47.38″ | 17.141 | | 20.9 | M7.0V | |
| Gliese 3634 | | | | | | | 10^{h} 58^{m} 35^{s} | −31° 08′ 39″ | 19.8 | | 65 | M2.5 | has a planet (b) |
| WASP-84 | | | | | | | 08^{h} 44^{m} 26.0^{s} | +01° 50′ 36″ | | | 391 | K0 | has a transiting planet |
| G 161-71 | | | | | | | 09^{h} 44^{m} 54.224^{s} | −12° 20′ 54.43″ | 13.6 | | 43.4 | M4.5 | has one Saturn-mass planet candidate from direct imaging |
Table legend: • Name = Proper name • B = Bayer designation • F or/and G. = Flamsteed designation or Gould designation • Var = Variable-star designation • HD = Henry Draper Catalogue designation number • HIP = Hipparcos Catalogue designation number • RA = Right ascension for the Epoch/Equinox J2000.0 • Dec = Declination for the Epoch/Equinox J2000.0 • vis. mag. = visual magnitude (m or m_{v}), also known as apparent magnitude • abs. mag. = absolute magnitude (M_{v}) • Dist. (ly) = Distance in light-years from Earth • Sp. class = Spectral class of the star in the stellar classification system • Notes = Common name(s) or alternate name(s); comments; notable properties [for example: multiple star status, range of variability if it is a variable star, exoplanets, etc.]

== See also ==
- List of stars by constellation

== Bibliography ==
- ESA (1997). "The Hipparcos and Tycho Catalogues".
- Kostjuk, N. D. (2002). "HD-DM-GC-HR-HIP-Bayer-Flamsteed Cross Index".
- Roman, N. G. (1987). "Identification of a Constellation from a Position".
- Gould, B. A. "Uranometria Argentina". Reprinted and updated by Pilcher, F. Archived from the original on 2012-02-27.
- "Naming Stars".
