= Vermilion Bird =

One of the Four Symbols of the Chinese constellations

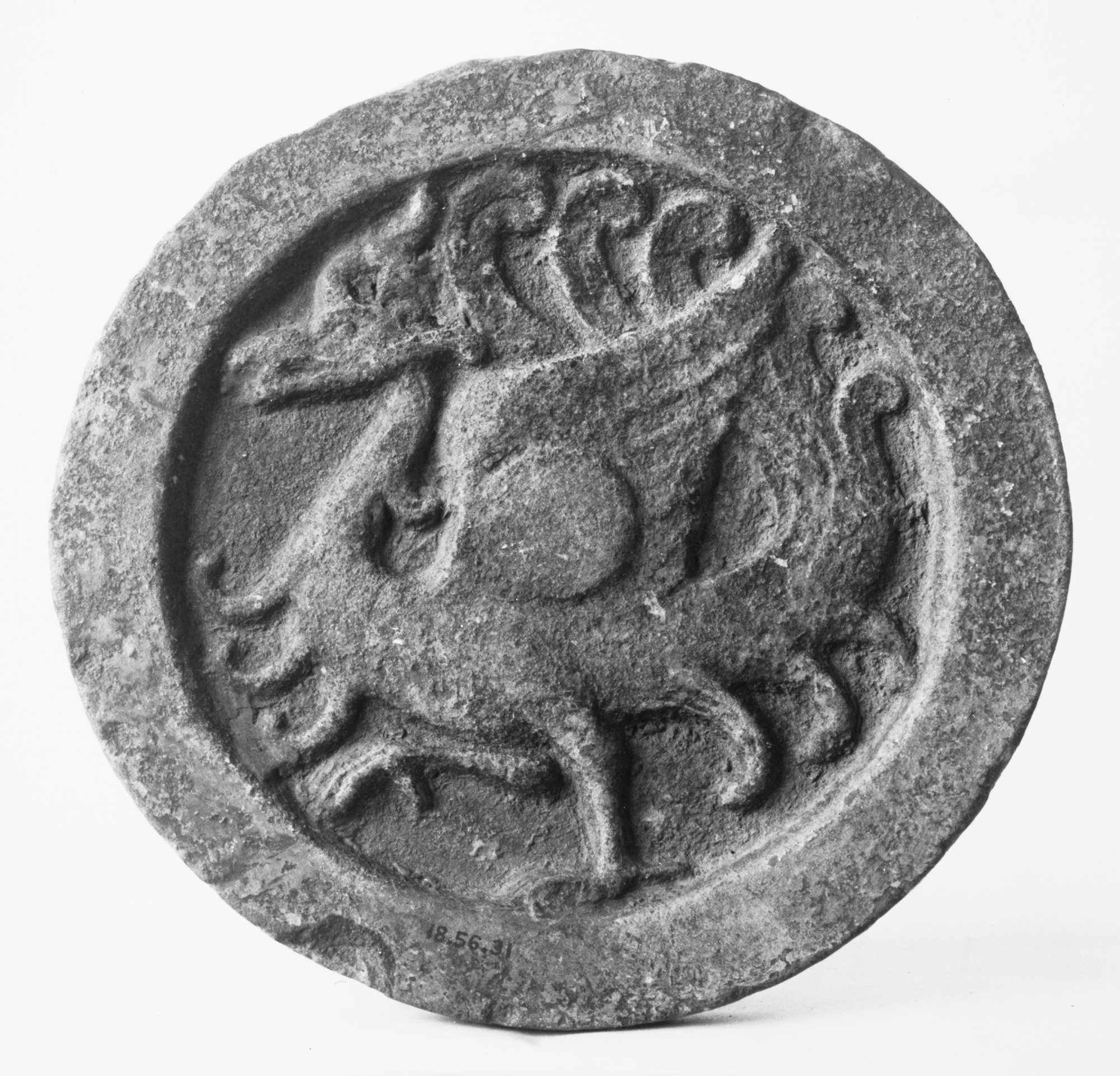
- Zhūquè sculpture on an eaves tile

Chinese name
- Chinese: 朱雀
- Literal meaning: "Vermilion Peafowl"
Transcriptions
Standard Mandarin
- Hanyu Pinyin: Zhūquè
- Wade–Giles: Chu^{1}-ch'üeh^{4}
- IPA: [ʈʂu.tɕʰɥê]
Yue: Cantonese
- Yale Romanization: Jyūjeuk
- Jyutping: Zyu1-zoek3
- IPA: [tsy˥.tsœk̚˧]
Southern Min
- Hokkien POJ: Chu-chhiok

Vietnamese name
- Vietnamese alphabet: Chu Tước
- Chữ Hán: 朱雀

Korean name
- Hangul: 주작
- Hanja: 朱雀
Transcriptions
- Revised Romanization: Jujak

Japanese name
- Kanji: 朱雀
- Hiragana: すざく
Transcriptions
- Kunrei-shiki: Suzaku or Syuzyaku

The Vermilion Bird (Chinese: 朱雀; pinyin: Zhūquè) is one of the Four Symbols of the Chinese constellations. According to Wu Xing, the Taoist five elemental system, it represents the Fire element, the direction south, and the season of summer correspondingly. Thus it is sometimes called the Vermilion Bird of the South (Chinese: 南方朱雀; pinyin: Nánfāng Zhūquè). It is described as a red bird that resembles a pheasant with a fire-colored plumage and is perpetually covered in flames. It is known as Suzaku in Japanese, Jujak in Korean and Chu Tước in Vietnamese.

It is often mistaken for the fenghuang due to similarities in appearance, but the two are different creatures. The fenghuang is a legendary ruler of birds who is associated with the Chinese Empress in the same way the dragon is associated with the Emperor, while the Vermilion Bird is a mythological spirit creature of the Chinese constellations.

== Seven Mansions of the Vermilion Bird ==
As with the other three Symbols, there are seven astrological "Mansions" (positions of the Moon) within the Vermilion Bird. The names and determinative stars are:

Mansion no.	Name (pinyin)	Translation	Determinative star
22	井 (Jǐng)	Well	μ Gem
23	鬼 (Guǐ)	Ghost	θ Cnc
24	柳 (Liǔ)	Willow	δ Hya
25	星 (Xīng)	Star	α Hya
26	張 (Zhāng)	Extended Net	υ¹ Hya
27	翼 (Yì)	Wings	α Crt
28	軫 (Zhěn)	Chariot	γ Crv

== Nature of the symbol ==
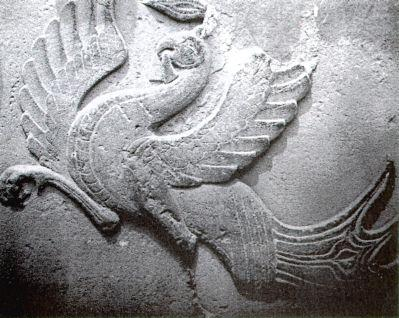
The Vermilion Bird on the gates of a Han dynasty mausoleum complex

The Vermilion Bird is covered with feathers in many different hues of vermilion. It is selective about what it eats and perches.

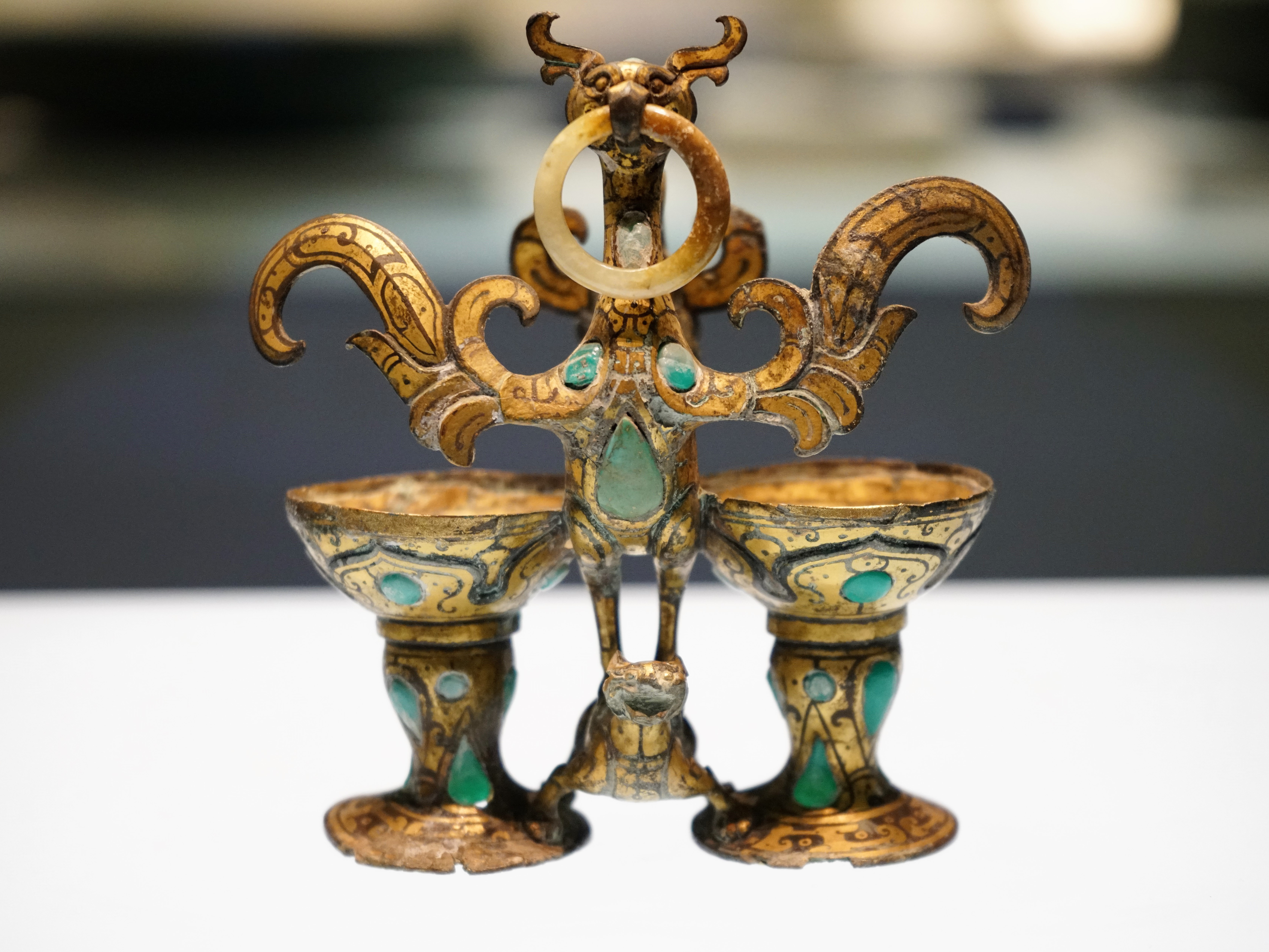
Han dynasty decorative bronze cup in the shape of zhuque, from Tomb of Dou Wan.

== Stars ==
Four Symbols	Mansion (Chinese name)	Romanization	Translation	Asterisms (Chinese name)	Romanization	Translation	Western star name	Chinese star name	Romanization	Translation
Vermilion Bird of the South (南方朱雀)	鬼	Guǐ	Ghost	外廚	Wàichú	Outer Kitchen				
Vermilion Bird of the South (南方朱雀)	鬼	Guǐ	Ghost	外廚	Wàichú	Outer Kitchen	2 Hya	外廚一	Wàichúyī	1st star
Vermilion Bird of the South (南方朱雀)	鬼	Guǐ	Ghost	外廚	Wàichú	Outer Kitchen	3 Hya / HD 74395	外廚二	Wàichúèr	2nd star
Vermilion Bird of the South (南方朱雀)	鬼	Guǐ	Ghost	外廚	Wàichú	Outer Kitchen	14 Hya	外廚三	Wàichúsān	3rd star
Vermilion Bird of the South (南方朱雀)	柳	Liǔ	Willow	柳	Liǔ	Willow				
Vermilion Bird of the South (南方朱雀)	柳	Liǔ	Willow	柳	Liǔ	Willow	δ Hya			
Vermilion Bird of the South (南方朱雀)	柳	Liǔ	Willow	柳	Liǔ	Willow	δ Hya	柳宿一	Liǔxiùyī	1st star
Vermilion Bird of the South (南方朱雀)	柳	Liǔ	Willow	柳	Liǔ	Willow	δ Hya	柳宿距星	Liǔxiùjùxīng	Separated star
Vermilion Bird of the South (南方朱雀)	柳	Liǔ	Willow	柳	Liǔ	Willow	δ Hya	柳宿西头第三星	Liǔxiùxītoudìsānxīng	3rd star in the upper west
Vermilion Bird of the South (南方朱雀)	柳	Liǔ	Willow	柳	Liǔ	Willow	δ Hya	玉井西北星	Yùjǐngxīběixīng	Star in northwest of Jade Well constellation
Vermilion Bird of the South (南方朱雀)	柳	Liǔ	Willow	柳	Liǔ	Willow	δ Hya	午	Wǔ	The thong
Vermilion Bird of the South (南方朱雀)	柳	Liǔ	Willow	柳	Liǔ	Willow	δ Hya	鹑火星	Chúnhuǒxīng	The phoenix
Vermilion Bird of the South (南方朱雀)	柳	Liǔ	Willow	柳	Liǔ	Willow	σ Hya	柳宿二	Liǔxiùèr	2nd star
Vermilion Bird of the South (南方朱雀)	柳	Liǔ	Willow	柳	Liǔ	Willow	η Hya	柳宿三	Liǔxiùsān	3rd star
Vermilion Bird of the South (南方朱雀)	柳	Liǔ	Willow	柳	Liǔ	Willow	ρ Hya	柳宿四	Liǔxiùsì	4th star
Vermilion Bird of the South (南方朱雀)	柳	Liǔ	Willow	柳	Liǔ	Willow	ε Hya	柳宿五	Liǔxiùwǔ	5th star
Vermilion Bird of the South (南方朱雀)	柳	Liǔ	Willow	柳	Liǔ	Willow	ζ Hya	柳宿六	Liǔxiùliù	6th star
Vermilion Bird of the South (南方朱雀)	柳	Liǔ	Willow	柳	Liǔ	Willow	ω Hya	柳宿七	Liǔxiùqī	7th star
Vermilion Bird of the South (南方朱雀)	柳	Liǔ	Willow	柳	Liǔ	Willow	θ Hya	柳宿八	Liǔxiùbā	8th star
Vermilion Bird of the South (南方朱雀)	星	Xīng	Star	星	Xīng	Star				
Vermilion Bird of the South (南方朱雀)	星	Xīng	Star	星	Xīng	Star	α Hya			
Vermilion Bird of the South (南方朱雀)	星	Xīng	Star	星	Xīng	Star	α Hya	星宿一	Xīngxiùyī	1st star
Vermilion Bird of the South (南方朱雀)	星	Xīng	Star	星	Xīng	Star	α Hya	星宿距星	Xīngxiùjùxīng	Separated star
Vermilion Bird of the South (南方朱雀)	星	Xīng	Star	星	Xīng	Star	α Hya	星宿中央大星	Xīngxiùzhōngyāngdàxīng	Big star in the center
Vermilion Bird of the South (南方朱雀)	星	Xīng	Star	星	Xīng	Star	τ^{1} Hya	星宿二	Xīngxiùèr	2nd star
Vermilion Bird of the South (南方朱雀)	星	Xīng	Star	星	Xīng	Star	τ^{2} Hya	星宿三	Xīngxiùsān	3rd star
Vermilion Bird of the South (南方朱雀)	星	Xīng	Star	星	Xīng	Star	ι Hya	星宿四	Xīngxiùsì	4th star
Vermilion Bird of the South (南方朱雀)	星	Xīng	Star	星	Xīng	Star	26 Hya	星宿五	Xīngxiùwǔ	5th star
Vermilion Bird of the South (南方朱雀)	星	Xīng	Star	星	Xīng	Star	27 Hya	星宿六	Xīngxiùliù	6th star
Vermilion Bird of the South (南方朱雀)	星	Xīng	Star	星	Xīng	Star	HD 82477 & HD 82428	星宿七	Xīngxiùqī	7th star
Vermilion Bird of the South (南方朱雀)	張	Zhāng	Extended Net	張	Zhāng	Extended Net				
Vermilion Bird of the South (南方朱雀)	張	Zhāng	Extended Net	張	Zhāng	Extended Net	υ^{1} Hya	張宿一	Zhāngxiùyī	1st star
Vermilion Bird of the South (南方朱雀)	張	Zhāng	Extended Net	張	Zhāng	Extended Net	λ Hya	張宿二	Zhāngxiùèr	2nd star
Vermilion Bird of the South (南方朱雀)	張	Zhāng	Extended Net	張	Zhāng	Extended Net	μ Hya	張宿三	Zhāngxiùsān	3rd star
Vermilion Bird of the South (南方朱雀)	張	Zhāng	Extended Net	張	Zhāng	Extended Net	HD 87344	張宿四	Zhāngxiùsì	4th star
Vermilion Bird of the South (南方朱雀)	張	Zhāng	Extended Net	張	Zhāng	Extended Net	κ Hya	張宿五	Zhāngxiùwǔ	5th star
Vermilion Bird of the South (南方朱雀)	張	Zhāng	Extended Net	張	Zhāng	Extended Net	φ Hya	張宿六	Zhāngxiùliù	6th star
Vermilion Bird of the South (南方朱雀)	翼	Yì	Wings	翼	Yì	Wings				
Vermilion Bird of the South (南方朱雀)	翼	Yì	Wings	翼	Yì	Wings	ν Hya	翼宿五	Yìxiùwǔ	5th star
Vermilion Bird of the South (南方朱雀)	翼	Yì	Wings	翼	Yì	Wings	HD 100307	翼宿十八	Yìxiùshíbā	18th star
Vermilion Bird of the South (南方朱雀)	翼	Yì	Wings	翼	Yì	Wings	HD 96819	翼宿十九	Yìxiùshíjiǔ	19th star
Vermilion Bird of the South (南方朱雀)	翼	Yì	Wings	翼	Yì	Wings	χ^{1} Hya	翼宿二十	Yìxiùèrshí	20th star
Vermilion Bird of the South (南方朱雀)	翼	Yì	Wings	翼	Yì	Wings	HD 102620	翼宿二十一	Yìxiùèrshíyī	21st star
Vermilion Bird of the South (南方朱雀)	翼	Yì	Wings	翼	Yì	Wings	HD 103462	翼宿二十二	Yìxiùèrshíèr	22nd star
Vermilion Bird of the South (南方朱雀)	軫	Zhěn	Chariot	青丘	Qīngqiū	Green Hill				
Vermilion Bird of the South (南方朱雀)	軫	Zhěn	Chariot	青丘	Qīngqiū	Green Hill	β Hya			
Vermilion Bird of the South (南方朱雀)	軫	Zhěn	Chariot	青丘	Qīngqiū	Green Hill	β Hya	青丘一	Qīngqiūyī	1st star
Vermilion Bird of the South (南方朱雀)	軫	Zhěn	Chariot	青丘	Qīngqiū	Green Hill	β Hya	土公西星	Tǔgōngxīxīng	Star in the west of Official for Earthworks and Buildings constellation
Vermilion Bird of the South (南方朱雀)	軫	Zhěn	Chariot	青丘	Qīngqiū	Green Hill	HD 103596	青丘二	Qīngqiūèr	2nd star
Vermilion Bird of the South (南方朱雀)	軫	Zhěn	Chariot	青丘	Qīngqiū	Green Hill	17 Crt	青丘三	Qīngqiūsān	3rd star
Vermilion Bird of the South (南方朱雀)	軫	Zhěn	Chariot	青丘	Qīngqiū	Green Hill	HD 100393	青丘四	Qīngqiūsì	4th star
Vermilion Bird of the South (南方朱雀)	軫	Zhěn	Chariot	青丘	Qīngqiū	Green Hill	ξ Hya	青丘五	Qīngqiūwu	5th star
Vermilion Bird of the South (南方朱雀)	軫	Zhěn	Chariot	青丘	Qīngqiū	Green Hill	ο Hya	青丘七	Qīngqiūqī	7th star
Vermilion Bird of the South (南方朱雀)	軫	Zhěn	Chariot	軍門	Jūnmén	Military Gate	HD 104309	軍門一	Jūnményī	1st star

== In popular culture ==
In the MMORPG Final Fantasy XIV Online by Square Enix, a trial named "Hell's Kier" was added in Patch 4.4's Four Lords quest-line. The boss of this trial is named Suzaku and bears a resemblance to the Vermilion Bird.

In Kagurabachi, the character Seichi Samura wields the enchanted blade Tobimune that harnesses the power of Suzaku, the vermilion bird, giving him regenerative powers.

In Beyblade, Beyblade V-Force and Beyblade G-Revolution, the bit-beast Dranzer is modelled after the Vermillion Bird.

In Malifaux, the "Story of Suzaku" features as a unique model for the Ten Thunders Faction under the Red Library keyword.

== See also ==
- Birds in Chinese mythology
- Four Holy Beasts
