= Tau Hydrae =

The Bayer designation Tau Hydrae (τ Hya, τ Hydrae) is shared by two star systems in the equatorial constellation of Hydra. The two stars are separated by 1.74° in the sky.

- τ^{1} Hydrae, triple star system
- τ^{2} Hydrae, astrometric binary

The stars τ^{1} Hya and τ^{2} Hya, along with ι Hya and the 5th‑magnitude 33 Hya (A Hydrae), were Ptolemy's Καμπή (Kampē); but Kazwini knew them as ʽUḳdah, the Knot. According to the catalogue of stars in the Technical Memorandum 33-507 - A Reduced Star Catalog Containing 537 Named Stars, Uḳdah was the title for four stars: τ^{1} Hya as Uḳdah I, τ^{2} Hya as Uḳdah II, 33 Hya as Uḳdah III and ι Hya as Uḳdah IV. The name Ukdah is now officially applied to ι Hydrae.

In Chinese, 柳宿 (Xīng Sù), meaning Star (asterism), refers to an asterism consisting of τ^{1} and τ^{2} Hydrae, Alphard, ι Hydrae, 26 Hydrae, 27 Hydrae, HD 82477 and HD 82428. Consequently, τ^{1} and τ^{2} Hydrae are known as 星宿二 (Xīng Sù èr, English: the Second Star of Star) and 星宿三 (Xīng Sù sān, English: the Third Star of Star) respectively.
