= Upsilon Hydrae =

The Bayer designation υ Hydrae (Latinised to Upsilon Hydrae; abbreviated υ Hya, Ups Hya) is shared by two stars in the constellation of Hydra:

- υ^{1} Hydrae (also named Zhang)
- υ^{2} Hydrae

See also:

- U Hydrae, a variable star
