= HD 72561 =

Star in the constellation Hydra

Observation data Epoch J2000.0 Equinox J2000.0
- Constellation: Hydra
- Right ascension: 08^{h} 33^{m} 43.47908^{s}
- Declination: +04° 45′ 25.1949″
- Apparent magnitude (V): 5.867

Characteristics
- Evolutionary stage: horizontal branch
- Spectral type: G5 III
- U−B color index: +0.87
- B−V color index: +1.07

Astrometry
Radial velocity (R_{v})	+1.60±0.3 km/s
Proper motion (μ)	RA: −13.18 mas/yr Dec.: −6.84 mas/yr
Parallax (π)	1.98±0.41 mas
Distance	approx. 1,600 ly (approx. 500 pc)

Details (Note: The Reffert et al. paper gives two different sets of results, depending on whether the star is a horizontal branch star or a red giant branch star. The parameters given here are for a horizontal branch star, since the probability of it being a horizontal branch star is 99%.)
Mass	4.58±0.40 M_{☉}
Radius	48.41±9.26 R_{☉}
Luminosity	1,109.6±422.9 L_{☉}
Surface gravity (log g)	1.80±0.15 cgs
Temperature	4,792±36 K
Metallicity [Fe/H]	−0.16±0.10 dex
Age	0.15±0.04 Gyr

Other designations
- BD+05°1997, HIP 42008, HR 3378, SAO 116890

Database references
SIMBAD	data

HD 72561 is a star in the constellation Hydra. Its apparent magnitude is 5.867. Based on parallax shift, it is located about 1,600 light-years (500 parsecs) away.

HD 72561 is a G-type giant star. It is over 4 times as massive as the Sun and 48 times as wide. It is about 150 million years old.
