= Kappa Hydrae =

Star in the constellation Hydra

κ Hydrae
- Location of κ Hydrae (circled in red)

Observation data Epoch J2000.0 Equinox J2000.0 (ICRS)
- Constellation: Hydra
- Right ascension: 09^{h} 40^{m} 18.36319^{s}
- Declination: −14° 19′ 56.2396″
- Apparent magnitude (V): 5.06

Characteristics
- Evolutionary stage: main sequence
- Spectral type: B4 IV/V
- U−B color index: −0.57
- B−V color index: −0.15
- Variable type: Suspected

Astrometry
Radial velocity (R_{v})	20.6±2.0 km/s
Proper motion (μ)	RA: −26.481 mas/yr Dec.: −20.240 mas/yr
Parallax (π)	6.9952±0.1897 mas
Distance	470 ± 10 ly (143 ± 4 pc)
Absolute magnitude (M_{V})	−0.98

Details
Mass	5.0±0.1 M_{☉}
Radius	3.4 R_{☉}
Luminosity	328 L_{☉}
Temperature	16,150±920 K
Rotational velocity (v sin i)	115.0 km/s
Age	30.7±3.3 Myr

Other designations
- κ Hya, 38 Hydrae, BD−13°2917, FK5 364, HD 83754, HIP 47452, HR 3849, SAO 155388.

Database references
SIMBAD	data

κ Hydrae, Latinised as Kappa Hydrae, is a solitary star in the equatorial constellation of Hydra. Its apparent visual magnitude is 5.06, which is bright enough to be faintly visible to the naked eye. The distance to this star is around 470 ly (143 pc), based upon an annual parallax shift of 7.0 mas. It may be a variable star, meaning it undergoes repeated fluctuations in brightness by at least 0.1 magnitude.

This is an evolving B-type star with a stellar classification of B4 IV/V, having a luminosity class intermediate between a subgiant and a giant star. It has an estimated five times the mass of the Sun and 3.4 times the Sun's radius. Kappa Hydrae has a high rate of spin with a projected rotational velocity of 115.0 km/s, and is only about 31 million years old. The star radiates 328 times the solar luminosity from its outer atmosphere at an effective temperature of 16,150 K.

== Name ==
This star was one of the set assigned by the 16th-century astronomer Al Tizini to Al Sharāsīf (ألشراسيف), the Ribs (of Hydra), which included the stars from β Crateris westward through κ Hydrae.

According to the catalogue of stars in the Technical Memorandum 33-507 - A Reduced Star Catalog Containing 537 Named Stars, Al Sharāsīf were the title for two stars: β Crateris as Al Sharasīf II and κ Hydrae as Al Sharasīf I.

In Chinese, 張宿 (Zhāng Xiù), meaning Extended Net, refers to an asterism consisting of Kappa Hydrae, Upsilon1 Hydrae, Lambda Hydrae, Mu Hydrae, HD 87344, and Phi1 Hydrae. Consequently, Kappa Hydrae itself is known as 張宿五 (Zhāng Xiù wǔ), "the Fifth Star of Extended Net".
