= HD 85859 =

Star in the constellation Hydra

- Location of HD 85859 (circled in red)

Observation data Epoch J2000 Equinox ICRS
- Constellation: Hydra
- Right ascension: 09^{h} 54^{m} 12.32596^{s}
- Declination: −25° 55′ 56.3631″
- Apparent magnitude (V): 4.88

Characteristics
- Evolutionary stage: red clump
- Spectral type: K2+ III CN0.5
- B−V color index: 1.23

Astrometry
Radial velocity (R_{v})	50.5 km/s
Proper motion (μ)	RA: −187.764 mas/yr Dec.: +52.746 mas/yr
Parallax (π)	12.5809±0.2161 mas
Distance	259 ± 4 ly (79 ± 1 pc)
Absolute magnitude (M_{V})	−0.23

Details
Mass	1.55 M_{☉}
Luminosity	178 L_{☉}
Surface gravity (log g)	2.35 cgs
Temperature	4,415±25 K
Metallicity [Fe/H]	−0.03 dex
Age	4.34 Gyr

Other designations
- CD−25°7585, FK5 2792, HD 85859, HIP 48559, HR 3919, SAO 178158

Database references
SIMBAD	data

HD 85859 is a single star in the equatorial constellation of Hydra. It has an apparent visual magnitude of 4.88, which is bright enough to be visible to the naked eye. The distance to this star, as estimated from its annual parallax shift of 12.6 mas, is 259 light years. It is moving away from the Earth with a heliocentric radial velocity of 50.5 km/s.

The stellar classification of the visible component is K2+ III CN0.5, which matches an evolved K-type giant star with a mild overabundance of CN in the atmosphere. At the age of 4.34 billion years, it is a red clump star, which indicates it is on the horizontal branch and is generating energy through helium fusion at its core. The star has 1.55 times the mass of the Sun and is radiating 178 times the Sun's luminosity from its enlarged photosphere at an effective temperature of 4,415 K.
