= 52 Hydrae =

Star in the constellation Hydra

Observation data Epoch J2000 Equinox J2000
- Constellation: Hydra
- Right ascension: 14^{h} 28^{m} 10.42638^{s}
- Declination: −29° 29′ 29.8884″
- Apparent magnitude (V): 4.97 (5.70 + 5.70 + 10.00)

Characteristics
- Evolutionary stage: main sequence
- Spectral type: B7/8V
- B−V color index: −0.074±0.003

Astrometry
Radial velocity (R_{v})	5.4±3.8 km/s
Proper motion (μ)	RA: −25.23 mas/yr Dec.: −23.03 mas/yr
Parallax (π)	8.29±0.28 mas
Distance	390 ± 10 ly (121 ± 4 pc)
Absolute magnitude (M_{V})	−0.43

Details

52 Hya A
Mass	3.82±0.06 M_{☉}
Luminosity	310.5+24.5 −22.8 L_{☉}
Temperature	12,853±89 K
Rotational velocity (v sin i)	204 km/s

Other designations
- l Hya, 52 Hya, CD−28°10712, FK5 532, HD 126769, HIP 70753, HR 5407, SAO 182570, ADS 9270, WDS J14282-2929

Database references
SIMBAD	data

52 Hydrae is a triple star system in the constellation Hydra. It has the Bayer designation l Hydrae; 52 Hydrae is the Flamsteed designation. This system is visible to the naked eye as a faint, blue-white hued star with an apparent visual magnitude of 4.97. It is a probable (80% chance) member of the Sco OB2 moving group of stars, and is moving away from the Earth with a heliocentric radial velocity of 5 km/s.

The primary component is a binary system consisting of two nearly equal components with an orbital period of around 15 years and an angular separation of 0.1″. It shows a combined stellar classification of B7/8V, which matches a B-type main-sequence star. The third component is a magnitude 10.0 star at a separation of 4.2″ with a mass similar to the Sun. It is orbiting the inner pair with a period of around 3,900 years.
