= 12 Hydrae =

Star in the constellation Hydra

- Location of 12 Hydrae (circled in red)

Observation data Epoch J2000 Equinox ICRS
- Constellation: Hydra
- Right ascension: 08^{h} 46^{m} 22.54441^{s}
- Declination: −13° 32′ 51.8051″
- Apparent magnitude (V): 4.32

Characteristics
- Evolutionary stage: red giant branch
- Spectral type: G8 IIIb CN-1
- B−V color index: 0.900±0.015

Astrometry
Radial velocity (R_{v})	−8.5±0.7 km/s
Proper motion (μ)	RA: +10.316 mas/yr Dec.: −15.012 mas/yr
Parallax (π)	15.8840±0.3987 mas
Distance	205 ± 5 ly (63 ± 2 pc)
Absolute magnitude (M_{V})	+0.26

Orbit
Primary	Aa
Name	Ab
Period (P)	1,592±806 d
Semi-major axis (a)	0.0116±0.057″
Eccentricity (e)	0.40±0.26
Inclination (i)	58±10°
Longitude of the node (Ω)	91±16°
Periastron epoch (T)	49,194±664
Argument of periastron (ω) (secondary)	103±34°

Details
Mass	1.83 M_{☉}
Radius	10.8 R_{☉}
Luminosity	71 L_{☉}
Surface gravity (log g)	3.13 cgs
Temperature	5,105 K
Metallicity [Fe/H]	−0.01 dex
Rotational velocity (v sin i)	4.6±0.2 km/s
Age	410 Myr

Other designations
- D Hya, 12 Hya, BD−13°2673, HD 74918, HIP 43067, HR 3484, SAO 154622, WDS J08464-1333

Database references
SIMBAD	data

12 Hydrae is a probable astrometric binary star system located 205 light years away from the Sun in the equatorial constellation of Hydra. It has the Bayer designation D Hydrae; 12 Hydrae is the Flamsteed designation. This system is visible to the naked eye as a faint, yellow-hued star with a combined apparent visual magnitude of 4.32. It is moving closer to the Earth with a heliocentric radial velocity of −8.5 km/s.

This was found to be a double star by R. A. Rossiter in 1953, with the magnitude 13.7 companion having an angular separation of 26.8″ along a position angle of 266°, as of 2016. The brighter, magnitude 4.32 component A is a spectroscopic binary. As of 2009, the orbital solution for this pair is of low quality, giving a period of roughly 4 years and an eccentricity of around 0.4.

The primary component is an aging giant star with a stellar classification of G8 IIIb CN-1, where the suffix notation indicates an underabundance of the cyanogen molecule. It is 410 million years old with 1.8 times the mass of the Sun. After exhausting the hydrogen at its core and evolving off the main sequence, the star has swollen to 11 times the Sun's radius. It is radiating 71 times the luminosity of the Sun from its enlarged photosphere at an effective temperature of 5,105 K.
