= Alphard =

Star in the constellation Hydra

- Location of Alphard (circled)

Observation data Epoch J2000 Equinox ICRS
- Constellation: Hydra
- Right ascension: 09^{h} 27^{m} 35.2433^{s}
- Declination: −08° 39′ 30.969″
- Apparent magnitude (V): +2.00

Characteristics
- Evolutionary stage: horizontal branch
- Spectral type: K3IIIa
- U−B color index: +1.73
- B−V color index: +1.45

Astrometry
Radial velocity (R_{v})	−4.3 km/s
Proper motion (μ)	RA: −14.49 mas/yr Dec.: 33.25 mas/yr
Parallax (π)	18.40±0.78 mas
Distance	177 ± 8 ly (54 ± 2 pc)
Absolute magnitude (M_{V})	−1.743±0.032

Details
Mass	3.2±0.32 M_{☉}
Radius	57.59+0.63 −0.64 R_{☉}
Luminosity	971+154 −133 L_{☉}
Luminosity (visual, L_{V})	426 (Note: Calculated using the absolute magnitude in the equation 10^{4(4.83-M_{abs})}, where M_{abs} is the absolute magnitude) L_{☉}
Surface gravity (log g)	1.77 cgs
Temperature	4,117±18 K
Metallicity [Fe/H]	−0.12 dex
Rotation	2,991 days
Rotational velocity (v sin i)	1.1 km/s
Age	420±160 Myr

Other designations
- Alphard, Alfard, Alphart, Kalbelaphard, Cor Hydrae, 30 Hydrae, HR 3748, BD−08°2680, HD 81797, SAO 136871, FK5 354, HIP 46390

Database references
SIMBAD	data

Alphard (/ˈælfɑːrd/) is the brightest star in the constellation of Hydra. It has the Bayer designation Alpha Hydrae, which is that is Latinized from α Hydrae, and abbreviated Alpha Hya or α Hya. It is a giant star, cooler than the Sun but larger and more luminous. It is about 177 light-years away.

== Nomenclature ==
α Hydrae (Latinised to Alpha Hydrae) is the star's Bayer designation.

The traditional name Alphard is from the Arabic الفرد (al-fard), "the individual", there being no other bright stars near it. It was also known as the "backbone of the Serpent" to the Arabs. In the catalogue of stars in the Calendarium of Al Achsasi Al Mouakket, it was designated Soheil al Fard, which was translated into Latin as Soheil Solitarius, meaning the bright solitary one. In 2016, the International Astronomical Union organized a Working Group on Star Names (WGSN) to catalog and standardize proper names for stars. The WGSN's first bulletin of July 2016 included a table of the first two batches of names approved by the WGSN; which included Alphard for this star. It is now so entered in the IAU Catalog of Star Names.

The Danish astronomer Tycho Brahe dubbed it Cor Hydræ, Latin for 'the heart of Hydra'.

In Chinese, 星宿 (Xīng Xiù), meaning Star, refers to an asterism consisting of Alphard, τ^{1} Hydrae, τ^{2} Hydrae, ι Hydrae, 26 Hydrae, 27 Hydrae, HD 82477 and HD 82428. Consequently, Alphard itself is known as 星宿一 (Xīng Xiù yī), "the First Star of Star". In ancient China it formed part of an asterism called the "red bird".

== Properties ==
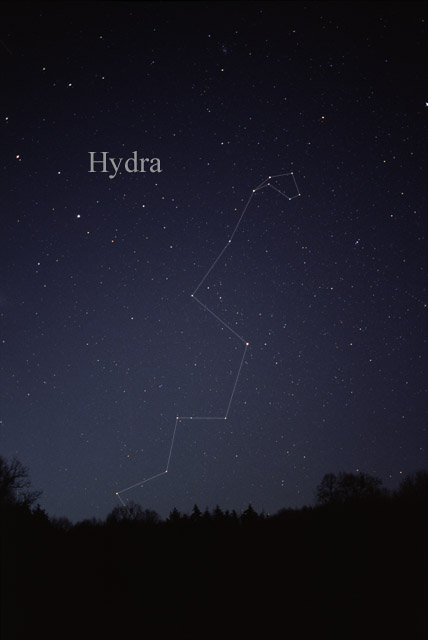
The western portion of Hydra, with Alphard the brightest star near the centre

Alphard has three times the mass of the Sun. Its estimated age is 420 million years and it has evolved away from the main sequence to become a giant star with a spectral classification of K3 and luminosity class III. The angular diameter has been measured using interferometry, after correction for limb darkening, it yields a value of 9.693±0.046 mas. Assuming the distance of 54.3 parsecs (177 ly), it yields a physical size of 57.6 times the radius of the Sun.

Alphard's spectrum shows a mild excess of barium, an element that is normally produced by the s-process of nucleosynthesis. Typically a barium star belongs to a binary system and the anomalies in abundances are explained by mass transfer from a companion white dwarf star.

Precise radial velocity measurements have shown variations in the stellar radial velocities and spectral line profiles. The oscillations are multi-periodic with periods from several hours up to several days. The short-term oscillations were assumed to be a result of stellar pulsations, similar to the solar ones. A correlation between the variations in the asymmetry of the spectral line profile and the radial velocity has also been found. The multi-periodic oscillations make HD 81797 (Alphard) an object of interest for asteroseismologic investigations.

== Modern legacy ==
Alphard appears on the flag of Brazil, symbolising the state of Mato Grosso do Sul.

The Toyota Alphard is a minivan named after this star.

The character Roy Alphard from Japanese light novel series Re:Zero is named after this star.
