= 2 Sextantis =

Star in the constellation Hydra

- Location of 2 Sextantis (circled in red)

Observation data Epoch J2000.0 Equinox ICRS
- Constellation: Hydra
- Right ascension: 09^{h} 38^{m} 27.28962^{s}
- Declination: +04° 38′ 57.4461″
- Apparent magnitude (V): 4.68

Characteristics
- Evolutionary stage: giant
- Spectral type: K3 III
- B−V color index: +1.310±0.033

Astrometry
Radial velocity (R_{v})	+44.61±0.23 km/s
Proper motion (μ)	RA: −163.18 mas/yr Dec.: −50.88 mas/yr
Parallax (π)	11.04±0.27 mas
Distance	295 ± 7 ly (91 ± 2 pc)
Absolute magnitude (M_{V})	−0.10

Details
Mass	1.32 M_{☉}
Radius	24 R_{☉}
Luminosity	191 L_{☉}
Surface gravity (log g)	2.09±0.22 cgs
Temperature	4,188±33 K
Metallicity [Fe/H]	−0.30±0.09 dex
Rotational velocity (v sin i)	3.0 km/s
Age	4.58 Gyr

Other designations
- 2 Sex, BD+05°2207, FK5 1249, HD 83425, HIP 47310, HR 3834, SAO 117821

Database references
SIMBAD	data

2 Sextantis is a single star that is now in the equatorial constellation Hydra with the Bayer designation H Hydrae. It is located around 295 light-years away from the Sun and it is visible to the naked eye as a faint, orange-hued star with an apparent visual magnitude of 4.68. This object is moving further from the Earth with a heliocentric radial velocity of +44.6 km/s. It has a relatively high proper motion, traversing the celestial sphere at the rate of 0.173″ per year.

This is a giant star with a stellar classification of K3 III, which, at the age of 4.58 billion years old, has exhausted the hydrogen at its core and evolved away from the main sequence. The star has 1.32 times the mass of the Sun and has expanded to 24 times the Sun's radius. It is radiating 191 times the luminosity of the Sun from its enlarged photosphere at an effective temperature of 4,188 K.
