= 9 Hydrae =

Star in the constellation Hydra

- Location of 9 Hydrae (circled in red)

Observation data Epoch J2000 Equinox ICRS
- Constellation: Hydra
- Right ascension: 08^{h} 41^{m} 43.33591^{s}
- Declination: −15° 56′ 36.1727″
- Apparent magnitude (V): 4.866

Characteristics
- Evolutionary stage: red clump
- Spectral type: K0 III CNII
- U−B color index: +0.92
- B−V color index: +1.07

Astrometry
Radial velocity (R_{v})	−1.98±0.12 km/s
Proper motion (μ)	RA: 3.676 mas/yr Dec.: -97.743 mas/yr
Parallax (π)	15.9089±0.1297 mas
Distance	205 ± 2 ly (62.9 ± 0.5 pc)
Absolute magnitude (M_{V})	+0.81

Details
Mass	1.72±0.46 M_{☉}
Radius	11.10+0.15 −0.69 R_{☉}
Luminosity	54.445+0.536 −0.457 L_{☉}
Surface gravity (log g)	2.8 cgs
Temperature	4,688±5 K
Metallicity [Fe/H]	−0.01 dex
Rotational velocity (v sin i)	1.7 km/s

Other designations
- 9 Hya, BD−15°2554, FK5 2684, HD 74137, HIP 42662, HR 3441, SAO 154552

Database references
SIMBAD	data

9 Hydrae is a single star in the equatorial constellation of Hydra, located 205 light years away from the Sun. It is visible to the naked eye as a faint, yellow-orange hued star with an apparent visual magnitude of 4.87. This body is moving closer to the Sun with a heliocentric radial velocity of −2 km/s.

This is an aging giant star with a stellar classification of K0 III CNII, where the suffix notation indicates an overabundance of cyanogen in the spectrum. It is a red clump giant, which indicates it is on the horizontal branch and is generating energy through helium fusion at its core. The star has 1.7 times the mass of the Sun but, as a consequence of evolving away from the main sequence, its envelope has swollen to 11 times the Sun's radius. It is radiating 54 times the luminosity of the Sun from its enlarged photosphere at an effective temperature of 4,688 K.
