= Upsilon1 Hydrae =

Star in the constellation Hydra

Upsilon^{1} Hydrae
- Location of υ^{1} Hydrae (circled in red)

Observation data Epoch J2000.0 Equinox J2000.0
- Constellation: Hydra
- Right ascension: 09^{h} 51^{m} 28.69384^{s}
- Declination: −14° 50′ 47.7710″
- Apparent magnitude (V): 4.12

Characteristics
- Spectral type: G6/8III
- U−B color index: +0.65
- B−V color index: +0.92

Astrometry
Radial velocity (R_{v})	−14.34 km/s
Proper motion (μ)	RA: +18.88 mas/yr Dec.: −21.85 mas/yr
Parallax (π)	12.36±0.26 mas
Distance	264 ± 6 ly (81 ± 2 pc)
Absolute magnitude (M_{V})	−0.43

Details
Mass	3.33 M_{☉}
Radius	14.69 R_{☉}
Luminosity	162 L_{☉}
Surface gravity (log g)	2.95 cgs
Temperature	5,185 K
Metallicity [Fe/H]	0.10 dex
Rotational velocity (v sin i)	2.11 km/s
Age	270 Myr

Other designations
- Zhang, υ^{1} Hya, 39 Hya, BD−14°2963, HD 85444, HIP 48356, HR 3903, SAO 155542

Database references
SIMBAD	data

Upsilon^{1} Hydrae, Latinised from υ^{1} Hydrae (Ups^{1} Hya, υ^{1} Hya) formally named Zhang, is a yellow-hued star in the constellation of Hydra. It is visible to the naked eye, having an apparent visual magnitude of 4.12. Based upon an annual parallax shift of 12.36 mas as seen from Earth, it is located about 264 light-years from the Sun. The star is moving closer to the Sun with a radial velocity of −14.34 km/s. In 2005 it was announced that it had a substellar companion.

== Nomenclature ==
υ^{1} Hydrae (Latinised to Upsilon^{1} Hydrae, abbreviated Ups^{1} Hya, υ^{1} Hya) is the star's Bayer designation.

In Chinese, 張宿 (Zhāng Xiù), meaning Extended Net, refers to an asterism consisting of Upsilon^{1} Hydrae, Lambda Hydrae, Mu Hydrae, HD 87344, Kappa Hydrae and Phi^{1} Hydrae. Consequently, Upsilon^{1} Hydrae itself is known as 張宿一 (Zhāng Xiù yī), "the First Star of Extended Net". In 2016, the International Astronomical Union (IAU) organized a Working Group on Star Names (WGSN) to catalog and standardize proper names for stars. The WGSN approved the name Zhang for Upsilon^{1} Hydrae on 30 June 2017 and it is now so included in the List of IAU-approved Star Names.

== Properties ==
With a stellar classification of G6/8 III, Upsilon^{1} Hydrae is an evolved G-type giant star. It has an estimated 3.3 times the mass of the Sun and has expanded to 14.7 times the Sun's radius. The star is about 270 million years old with a projected rotational velocity of just 2.11 km/s. It is radiating 162 times the Sun's luminosity from its photosphere at an effective temperature of 5,185 K.

== Substellar companion ==
The Okayama Planet Search team published a paper in 2005 reporting investigations on radial velocity variations observed for a set of class G giants and announcing the detection of a brown dwarf companion in orbit around Upsilon^{1} Hydrae. The orbital period for this companion is roughly 4.1 years, and it has a high eccentricity of 0.57. Since the inclination of the orbit to the line-of-sight is unknown, only a lower bound on the mass can be determined. It has at least 49 times the mass of Jupiter.

The Upsilon^{1} Hydrae planetary system
Companion (in order from star)	Mass	Semimajor axis (AU)	Orbital period (days)	Eccentricity	Inclination (°)	Radius
b	≥49 M_{J}	3.9	1,500	0.57	—	—
