= 51 Hydrae =

Star in the constellation Hydra

- Location of 51 Hydrae (circled in red)

Observation data Epoch J2000 Equinox ICRS
- Constellation: Hydra
- Right ascension: 14^{h} 23^{m} 05.77393^{s}
- Declination: −27° 45′ 14.4609″
- Apparent magnitude (V): 4.78

Characteristics
- Evolutionary stage: giant
- Spectral type: K4 III
- B−V color index: 1.300±0.040

Astrometry
Radial velocity (R_{v})	19.7±0.9 km/s
Proper motion (μ)	RA: −202.476 mas/yr Dec.: −117.186 mas/yr
Parallax (π)	19.2042±0.2252 mas
Distance	170 ± 2 ly (52.1 ± 0.6 pc)
Absolute magnitude (M_{V})	1.36

Details
Mass	1.31 M_{☉}
Radius	13.47+0.48 −1.26 R_{☉}
Luminosity	54.9+0.8 −1.5 L_{☉}
Surface gravity (log g)	2.25 cgs
Temperature	4,255±31 K
Metallicity [Fe/H]	0.08 dex

Other designations
- k Hya, 51 Hya, NSV 6648, CD−27°9803, HD 125932, HIP 70306, HR 5381, SAO 182483

Database references
SIMBAD	data

51 Hydrae is a single star in the equatorial constellation of Hydra, located 170 light years away from the Sun. It has the Bayer designation k Hydrae; 51 Hydrae is the Flamsteed designation. This object is visible to the naked eye as a faint, orange-hued star with an apparent visual magnitude of 4.78. It is moving further from the Earth with a heliocentric radial velocity of +20 km/s. Eggen (1971) listed it as a member of the η Cephei group of old-disk stars.

This is an evolved giant star with a stellar classification of K4 III, which indicates it has exhausted the supply of hydrogen at its core and expanded off the main sequence. It has 1.31 times the mass of the Sun but has swollen to 13.5 times the Sun's radius. The star is radiating 55 times the luminosity of the Sun from its enlarged photosphere at an effective temperature of 4,255 K.
