= 17 Crateris =

Binary star system in the constellation Hydra

Observation data Epoch J2000 Equinox J2000
Constellation	Hydra
- 17 Crt A
Right ascension	11^{h} 32^{m} 16.40436^{s}
Declination	−29° 15′ 39.6740″
- Apparent magnitude (V): 5.64
- 17 Crt B
Right ascension	11^{h} 32^{m} 16.03998^{s}
Declination	−29° 15′ 47.8935″
- Apparent magnitude (V): 5.76

Characteristics
- Spectral type: F8V + F8V
- B−V color index: 0.540±0.004

Astrometry

17 Crt A
Radial velocity (R_{v})	+5.8±0.4 km/s
Proper motion (μ)	RA: −19.601 mas/yr Dec.: +144.524 mas/yr
Parallax (π)	36.0601±0.1266 mas
Distance	90.4 ± 0.3 ly (27.73 ± 0.10 pc)
Absolute magnitude (M_{V})	+3.48

17 Crt B
Proper motion (μ)	RA: −22.025 mas/yr Dec.: +139.982 mas/yr
Parallax (π)	35.9838±0.1320 mas
Distance	90.6 ± 0.3 ly (27.8 ± 0.1 pc)
Absolute magnitude (M_{V})	+3.57

Details

17 Crt A
Mass	1.20 M_{☉}
Radius	1.6 R_{☉}
Luminosity	3.2 L_{☉}
Surface gravity (log g)	4.17 cgs
Temperature	6,240 K
Metallicity [Fe/H]	0.04±0.15 dex
Rotational velocity (v sin i)	10.0 km/s
Age	3.95 Gyr

17 Crt B
Mass	1.18 M_{☉}
Radius	1.5 R_{☉}
Luminosity	2.8 L_{☉}
Surface gravity (log g)	4.20 cgs
Temperature	6,269 K
Metallicity [Fe/H]	−0.06±0.15 dex
Rotational velocity (v sin i)	9.6 km/s
Age	3.67 Gyr

Other designations
- 17 Crt, CD−28°8928, HIP 56280, ADS 8202, CCDM J11323-2916AB, WDS J11323-2916
- 17 Crt A: HD 100287, HR 4444, SAO 179968
- 17 Crt B: HD 100286, HR 4443, SAO 179967

Database references
SIMBAD	data
- A
- B

17 Crateris is a wide binary star system in the equatorial constellation of Hydra, located 90.5 light years away from the Sun. It is visible to the naked eye as a faint, yellow-white hued star with a combined apparent visual magnitude of 4.93. The system is traversing the celestial sphere with a relative proper motion of 24.9 mas/y, and is moving away from the Earth with a heliocentric radial velocity of +5.8 km/s.

The dual nature of this system was discovered by W. Herschel in 1783, when they showed an angular separation of 9.8″. As of 2015, the two components of this system had a separation of 9.60″ along a position angle of 210°. This is equivalent to a projected separation of 241.3 AU; wide enough that, thus far, their orbital track appears linear. They are nearly identical F-type main-sequence stars with a stellar classification of F8V. The primary is slightly brighter at magnitude 5.64, while the secondary is magnitude 5.76.
