= Extended Net =

Chinese constellation

The Extended Net mansion (simplified Chinese: 张宿; traditional Chinese: 張宿; pinyin: Zhāng Xiù) is one of the Twenty-eight mansions of the Chinese constellations. It is one of the southern mansions of the Vermilion Bird.

== Asterisms ==
English name	Chinese name	European constellation	Number of stars
Extended Net	張	Hydra	6
Celestial Temple	天廟	Antlia/Pyxis	14
