= Xi Hydrae =

Star in the constellation Hydra

- Location of ξ Hydrae (circled in red)

Observation data Epoch J2000.0 Equinox J2000.0 (ICRS)
- Constellation: Hydra
- Right ascension: 11^{h} 33^{m} 00.11505^{s}
- Declination: −31° 51′ 27.4435″
- Apparent magnitude (V): 3.54

Characteristics
- Spectral type: G7 III

Astrometry
Radial velocity (R_{v})	−4.90±0.30 km/s
Proper motion (μ)	RA: −209.62 mas/yr Dec.: −40.84 mas/yr
Parallax (π)	25.16±0.16 mas
Distance	129.6 ± 0.8 ly (39.7 ± 0.3 pc)
Absolute magnitude (M_{V})	+0.54

Details
Mass	2.94±0.15 M_{☉}
Radius	10.28±0.11 R_{☉}
Luminosity	61.0±1.5 L_{☉}
Surface gravity (log g)	2.78±0.07 cgs
Temperature	5,034±34 K
Metallicity [Fe/H]	+0.16±0.20 dex
Rotational velocity (v sin i)	2.7 km/s
Age	510 Myr

Other designations
- ξ Hya, 288 G. Hydrae, CD−31°9083, HD 100407, HIP 56343, HR 4450, SAO 202558

Database references
SIMBAD	data

Xi Hydrae, Latinised from ξ Hydrae, is a solitary star in the equatorial constellation of Hydra. With an apparent magnitude of 3.54 it is visible to the naked eye. Based on parallax measurements, the star is situated 130 light-years from Earth.

Flamsteed gave Xi Hydrae the designation 19 Crateris. He included a number of stars now within the IAU boundaries of Hydra as part of a Hydra & Crater constellation overlapping parts of both modern constellations.

== Charactertistics ==
Xi Hydrae has left the main sequence, having exhausted the supply of hydrogen in its core. Its spectrum is that of a red giant. Modelling its physical properties against theoretical evolutionary tracks shows that it has just reached the foot of the red giant branch for a star with an initial mass around 3 M_{☉}. This puts its age at about 510 Myr. The star has 10.28 times the Sun's radius, 61 times the Sun's luminosity and an effective temperature of 5,034 K.

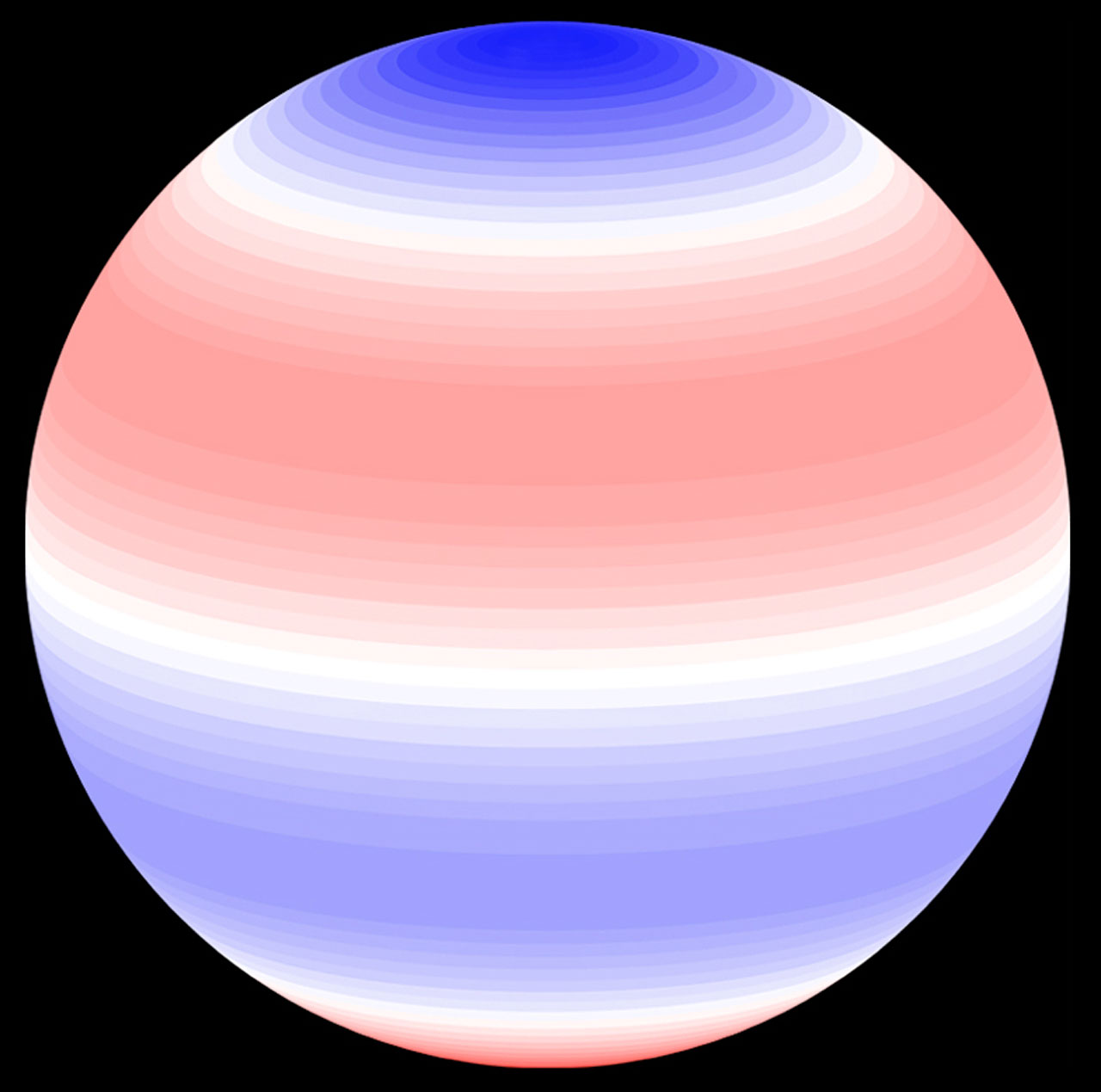
One possible non-radial oscillation mode of Xi Hydrae

The star Xi Hydrae is particularly interesting in the field of asteroseismology since it shows solar-like oscillations. Multiple frequency oscillations are found with periods between 2.0 and 5.5 hours.
