= HD 96819 =

Star in the constellation Hydra

Observation data Epoch J2000 Equinox ICRS
- Constellation: Hydra
- Right ascension: 11^{h} 08^{m} 43.99011^{s}
- Declination: −28° 04′ 50.3539″
- Apparent magnitude (V): 5.43

Characteristics
- Evolutionary stage: main sequence
- Spectral type: A1V
- U−B color index: +0.06
- B−V color index: +0.07

Astrometry
Radial velocity (R_{v})	16.0±7.4 km/s
Proper motion (μ)	RA: −69.211 mas/yr Dec.: −22.181 mas/yr
Parallax (π)	18.3139±0.0752 mas
Distance	178.1 ± 0.7 ly (54.6 ± 0.2 pc)
Absolute magnitude (M_{V})	1.61

Details

HD 96819 A
Mass	1.93 M_{☉}
Radius	1.80 R_{☉}
Luminosity	20.66 L_{☉}
Surface gravity (log g)	4.22±0.08 cgs
Temperature	8,954 K
Rotational velocity (v sin i)	249 km/s
Age	9±1 Myr

HD 96819 B
Mass	0.51 M_{☉}
Radius	0.47 R_{☉}
Temperature	3,792 K

Other designations
- NSV 5101, CD−27°7886, HD 96819, HIP 54477, HR 4334, SAO 179577

Database references
SIMBAD	data

HD 96819 is a star in the equatorial constellation of Hydra. It was formerly known by its designation 10 Crateris, but that name fell into disuse after constellations were redrawn and the star was no longer in Crater. It is visible to the naked eye as a dim, white-hued star with an apparent visual magnitude of 5.43. Parallax measurements put it at a distance of 178 light years away from the Sun. This is most likely (98.7% chance) a member of the TW Hydrae association.

This is a rapidly rotating A-type main-sequence star that is about double the mass of the Sun. It emits 20.66 times as much energy as the Sun, at an effective temperature of 8,954 K. HD 96819 is currently 31.5% through its life as a main-sequence star: after that it will swell up as a red giant. It is a young star of around nine million years age, and is a suspected variable star. Previously thought to be a single star, in 2022 a companion star was discovered, making HD 96819 a binary star. The companion star has about half the mass of the Sun.
