= F Hydrae =

Star in the constellation Hydra

- Location of F Hya (circled)

Observation data Epoch J2000 Equinox ICRS
- Constellation: Hydra
- Right ascension: 08^{h} 43^{m} 40.37345^{s}
- Declination: −07° 15′ 01.4323″
- Apparent magnitude (V): 4.64

Characteristics
- Spectral type: G1Ib
- B−V color index: +0.80

Astrometry
| Radial velocity (R_{v}) | 28.50 km/s |
| Proper motion (μ) | RA: −11.62 mas/yr Dec.: −1.36 mas/yr |
| Parallax (π) | 4.24±0.17 mas |
| Distance | 770 ± 30 ly (236 ± 9 pc) |
| Absolute magnitude (M_{V}) | −2.77 |

Details
| Mass | 5.2 M_{☉} |
| Radius | 110 R_{☉} |
| Luminosity | 4,502 L_{☉} |
| Surface gravity (log g) | 2.08 cgs |
| Temperature | 5,288 K |
| Metallicity [Fe/H] | −0.01 dex |
| Rotational velocity (v sin i) | 10.5 km/s |
| Age | 89 Myr |

Other designations
- F Hya, 31 Mon, HR 3459, HD 74395, BD−06°2708, SAO 136221, HIP 42835, WDS J08437-0714

Database references
| SIMBAD | data |

F Hydrae, also known as HD 74395, is a star in the constellation Hydra with an apparent magnitude is 4.64. It was catalogued as 31 Monocerotis, but this name is now rarely used since the star is now within the boundaries of Hydra. With about five times the mass of the Sun, it is a relatively low mass yellow supergiant several thousand times more luminous than the Sun.

F Hya is a catalogued as a triple star, with 8th magnitude BD−06°2707 80" away and 13th magnitude companion at 57".
