= Upsilon2 Hydrae =

Star in the constellation Hydra

Upsilon^{2} Hydrae
- Location of υ^{2} Hydrae (circled in red)

Observation data Epoch J2000.0 Equinox J2000.0 (ICRS)
- Constellation: Hydra
- Right ascension: 10^{h} 05^{m} 07.46888^{s}
- Declination: −13° 03′ 52.6561″
- Apparent magnitude (V): 4.59

Characteristics
- Evolutionary stage: main sequence
- Spectral type: B9 III-IV
- U−B color index: −0.27
- B−V color index: −0.08

Astrometry
Radial velocity (R_{v})	+24.3±2.6 km/s
Proper motion (μ)	RA: −39.39 mas/yr Dec.: +19.65 mas/yr
Parallax (π)	10.40±0.23 mas
Distance	314 ± 7 ly (96 ± 2 pc)
Absolute magnitude (M_{V})	−0.31

Details
Mass	2.92 M_{☉}
Radius	3.52 R_{☉}
Luminosity	172 L_{☉}
Surface gravity (log g)	3.81 cgs
Temperature	11,143 K
Rotational velocity (v sin i)	58 km/s
Age	97 Myr

Other designations
- υ^{2} Hya, 40 Hydrae, BD−12°3073, FK5 1261, HD 87504, HIP 49402, HR 3970, SAO 155713

Database references
SIMBAD	data

Upsilon^{2} Hydrae, Latinised from υ^{2} Hydrae, is a solitary star in the equatorial constellation of Hydra. Visible to the naked eye, it is photometrically stable with an apparent visual magnitude of 4.59. Based upon an annual parallax shift of 10.40 mas as seen from Earth, it is located about 314 light-years from the Sun.

This is a B-type star with a stellar classification of B9 III-IV, showing partial traits of a subgiant and giant star in its spectrum. However, Zorec and Royer (2012) estimate the star still only 79% of the way through its life span on the main sequence. With an age of around 97 million years, it is spinning with a projected rotational velocity of 58 km/s. The star has an estimated 2.9 times the mass of the Sun and around 3.5 times the Sun's radius. It is radiating 172 times the solar luminosity from its photosphere at an effective temperature of about 11,143 K.
