= Star (Chinese constellation) =

Constellation

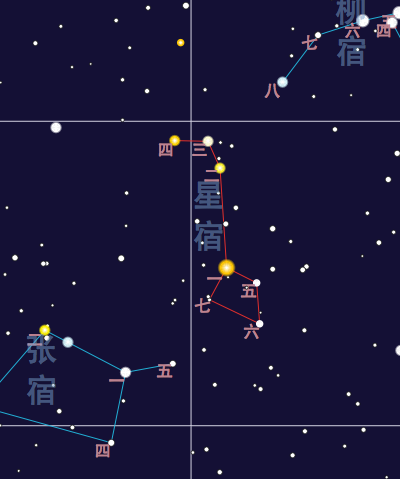
Xīng Xiù map

The Star mansion (星宿, pinyin: Xīng Xiù) is one of the Twenty-eight mansions of the Chinese constellations. It is one of the southern mansions of the Vermilion Bird.

== Asterisms ==
English name	Chinese name	European constellation	Number of stars
Star	星	Hydra	7
Celestial Premier	天相	Sextans	3
Celestial Cereals	天稷	Vela	5
Xuanyuan	軒轅	Leo/Lynx	17
Maids-In-Waiting	御女	Leo	1
High Judge	內平	Leo Minor	4
