= Omicron Hydrae =

Blue-hued star in the constellation Hydra

- Location of ο Hydrae (circled in red)

Observation data Epoch J2000.0 Equinox J2000.0 (ICRS)
- Constellation: Hydra
- Right ascension: 11^{h} 40^{m} 12.78970^{s}
- Declination: −34° 44′ 40.7733″
- Apparent magnitude (V): 4.70

Characteristics
- Evolutionary stage: main sequence
- Spectral type: B9 V
- U−B color index: −0.20
- B−V color index: −0.08

Astrometry
Radial velocity (R_{v})	+5.9 km/s
Proper motion (μ)	RA: −43.24 mas/yr Dec.: −1.61 mas/yr
Parallax (π)	7.27±0.16 mas
Distance	449 ± 10 ly (138 ± 3 pc)
Absolute magnitude (M_{V})	−0.99

Details
Mass	3.56±0.04 M_{☉}
Radius	5.5 R_{☉}
Luminosity	309 L_{☉}
Surface gravity (log g)	2.87 cgs
Temperature	10,495 K
Rotation	27.2 days
Rotational velocity (v sin i)	160 km/s
Age	252 Myr

Other designations
- ο Hya, CD−34°7610, FK5 439, HD 101431, HIP 56922, HR 4494, SAO 202695

Database references
SIMBAD	data

Omicron Hydrae (ο Hya) is the Bayer designation for a solitary star in the equatorial constellation Hydra. At one time it bore the Flamsteed designation 25 Crateris, but this is no longer used by astronomers so as to avoid confusion. With an apparent visual magnitude of 4.70, this star is visible to the naked eye. Based upon an annual parallax shift of 7.27 mas, it is located around 449 light years from the Sun.

This is a B-type main sequence star with a stellar classification of B9 V. It has completed an estimated 98.4%±1.1% of its lifetime on the main sequence. With 3.56 times the mass of the Sun, it radiates 309 times the Sun's luminosity from its outer atmosphere at an effective temperature of 10,495 K. The rate of spin is relatively high, with a projected rotational velocity of 160 km/s.
