= 26 Hydrae =

Binary star system in the constellation Hydra

- Location of 26 Hydrae (circled in red)

Observation data Epoch J2000 Equinox ICRS
- Constellation: Hydra
- Right ascension: 09^{h} 19^{m} 46.38309^{s}
- Declination: −11° 58′ 29.4577″
- Apparent magnitude (V): 4.770 + 12.4

Characteristics
- Evolutionary stage: red clump
- Spectral type: G7III or G8II
- U−B color index: +0.67
- B−V color index: +0.927±0.017

Astrometry
| Radial velocity (R_{v}) | −1.18±0.09 km/s |
| Proper motion (μ) | RA: −29.269 mas/yr Dec.: +11.613 mas/yr |
| Parallax (π) | 9.7770±0.1610 mas |
| Distance | 334 ± 5 ly (102 ± 2 pc) |
| Absolute magnitude (M_{V}) | −0.29 |

Details

26 Hya A
| Mass | 2.72 M_{☉} |
| Radius | 15.14+0.81 −2.47 R_{☉} |
| Luminosity | 138.5±2.7 L_{☉} |
| Surface gravity (log g) | 2.48±0.07 cgs |
| Temperature | 5,003±82 K |
| Metallicity [Fe/H] | −0.13±0.06 dex |
| Rotational velocity (v sin i) | 2.7 km/s |
| Age | 0.51 Gyr |

Other designations
- 26 Hya, BD−11°2609, FK5 2741, HD 80499, HIP 45751, HR 3706, SAO 155096, WDS J09198-1158AB

Database references
| SIMBAD | data |

26 Hydrae is a binary star system located 334 light years away from the Sun in the equatorial constellation of Hydra. It is visible to the naked eye as a faint, yellow-hued point of light with a combined apparent visual magnitude of 4.77, just a few degrees away from Alphard. The system is moving closer to the Earth with a leisurely radial velocity of -1 km/s.

Keenan and McNeil (1989) gave the brighter component a stellar classification of G7 III, matching an aging giant star. Houk and Swift (1999) have it classed as a G8II bright giant. This is a red clump giant, which indicates it is on the horizontal branch and is generating energy through helium fusion at its core. It has a high lithium abundance and displays a far infrared emission excess. The star is an estimated 510 million years old with 2.72 times the mass of the Sun and has expanded to 15 times the Sun's radius. It is radiating 139 times the luminosity of the Sun from its swollen photosphere at an effective temperature of 5,003 K.

The secondary component is a magnitude 12.4 star at an angular separation of 3.2″, as of 2008.
