= 27 Hydrae =

Triple star system in the constellation Hydra

- Location of 27 Hydrae (circled in red)

Observation data Epoch J2000 Equinox ICRS
- Constellation: Hydra
- Right ascension: 09^{h} 20^{m} 29.01857^{s}
- Declination: −09° 33′ 20.5054″
- Apparent magnitude (V): 4.818 (4.91 + 7.03 + 10.99)

Characteristics
- Evolutionary stage: red clump
- Spectral type: K0III + F4V + K2V

Astrometry
Radial velocity (R_{v})	+25.60±0.13 km/s
Proper motion (μ)	RA: −12.48 mas/yr Dec.: −27.37 mas/yr
Parallax (π)	14.66±0.31 mas
Distance	222 ± 5 ly (68 ± 1 pc)

Details

A
Mass	2.17 M_{☉}
Radius	11 R_{☉}
Luminosity	57.5 L_{☉}
Surface gravity (log g)	2.9 cgs
Temperature	4,965±26 K
Metallicity [Fe/H]	−0.07 dex
Rotational velocity (v sin i)	3.3 km/s
Age	1.91 Gyr

B
Radius	1.82 R_{☉}
Luminosity	5.885 L_{☉}
Temperature	6,664 K

C
Radius	0.72 R_{☉}
Luminosity	0.227 L_{☉}
Temperature	4,685 K

Other designations
- CCDM J09204-0934, WDS J09204-0934
- A: 27 Hya, BD−08°2643, HD 80586, HIP 45811, HR 3709, SAO 136768
- B: BD−09°2801, HD 80550, HIP 45802, SAO 136767
- C: TYC 5463-1518-1

Database references
SIMBAD	data
- B
- C

27 Hydrae is a triple star system in the equatorial constellation of Hydra, located 222 light years away from the Sun. It is visible to the naked eye as a faint, orange-hued star with a combined apparent visual magnitude of 4.82. The system is moving further from the Earth with a heliocentric radial velocity of +25.6 km/s.

The magnitude 4.91 primary, component A, is an aging giant star with a stellar classification of K0 III. It is a red clump giant, which indicates it is on the horizontal branch and is generating energy through helium fusion at its core. The star is 1.9 billion years old with 2.17 times the mass of the Sun. It has swelled to 11 times the Sun's radius and is radiating 57.5 times the Sun's luminosity from its enlarged photosphere at an effective temperature of 4,965 K. The star is suspected to host a low-mass companion.

The stellar companions to this star, designated components B and C, lie at an angular separation of 229.10″ from the primary, and form a binary pair with a separation of 9.20″ as of 2015. The brighter member of the pair, component B, is a seventh magnitude F-type main-sequence star with a class of F4 V, while its companion is an eleventh magnitude K-type main-sequence star with a class of K2 V.

== Substellar companion candidate ==
The Okayama Planet Search team published a paper in late 2008 reporting investigations into radial velocity variations observed for a set of evolved stars, showing hints of a substellar companion orbiting the primary member of the wide binary system 27 Hydrae (ADS 7311). A later study revised the minimum mass of this candidate companion to 28 Jupiter masses, indicating that if it exists, it is a brown dwarf rather than a planet.

The 27 Hydrae A planetary system
Companion (in order from star)	Mass	Semimajor axis (AU)	Orbital period (days)	Eccentricity	Inclination (°)	Radius
(unconfirmed)	≥28 M_{J}	≈5.9	3,400	—	—	—
