= Lambda Hydrae =

Star in the constellation Hydra

λ Hydrae
- Location of λ Hydrae (circled)

Observation data Epoch J2000 Equinox ICRS
- Constellation: Hydra
- Right ascension: 10^{h} 10^{m} 35.27667^{s}
- Declination: −12° 21′ 14.6938″
- Apparent magnitude (V): 3.61

Characteristics
- Evolutionary stage: red clump
- Spectral type: K0IIIbCN0.5
- U−B color index: +0.92
- B−V color index: +1.00

Astrometry
Radial velocity (R_{v})	19.4 km/s
Proper motion (μ)	RA: −201.27 mas/yr Dec.: −99.63 mas/yr
Parallax (π)	30.0232±0.6973 mas
Distance	109 ± 3 ly (33.3 ± 0.8 pc)
Absolute magnitude (M_{V})	+0.92

Orbit
Period (P)	1585.8 days
Semi-major axis (a)	16.79 mas
Eccentricity (e)	0.138
Inclination (i)	79.49°
Longitude of the node (Ω)	249.62°
Periastron epoch (T)	2448664.3906
Argument of periastron (ω) (secondary)	238.9°

Details

λ Hya A
Mass	1-2 M_{☉}
Radius	8.62+0.22 −0.23 R_{☉}
Luminosity	39.8 L_{☉}
Surface gravity (log g)	2.64 cgs
Temperature	4,656 K
Metallicity [Fe/H]	+0.25 dex
Rotational velocity (v sin i)	1.9 km/s

Other designations
- λ Hya, 41 Hydrae, BD−11°2820, HD 88284, HIP 49841, SAO 155785, HR 3994, GC 13982, TYC 5485-1310-1

Database references
SIMBAD	data

λ Hydrae, Latinised as Lambda Hydrae, is a spectroscopic binary star in the constellation Hydra. Its apparent magnitude is 3.61 Located around 33.3 parsecs (109 ly) distant. The spiral galaxy NGC 3145 is only 7.8′ away to the southwest.

The primary is an orange giant of spectral type K0IIICN+1, a star that has used up its core hydrogen, left the main sequence, and expanded into a giant. It is considered to be a red clump giant, a cool horizontal branch star that is burning helium in its core.

λ Hydrae has two visual companions, components B and C, 11th and 13th magnitude stars respectively 71″ and 111″ away.
