= Alpha Crateris =

Star in the constellation Crater

- Location of α Crateris (circled)

Observation data Epoch J2000 Equinox ICRS
- Constellation: Crater
- Right ascension: 10^{h} 59^{m} 46.46516^{s}
- Declination: −18° 17′ 55.6304″
- Apparent magnitude (V): 4.07

Characteristics
- Evolutionary stage: red clump
- Spectral type: K1 III
- B−V color index: 1.079±0.041

Astrometry
Radial velocity (R_{v})	47.54±0.16 km/s
Proper motion (μ)	RA: −462.303 mas/yr Dec.: 128.614 mas/yr
Parallax (π)	20.3693±0.1704 mas
Distance	160 ± 1 ly (49.1 ± 0.4 pc)
Absolute magnitude (M_{V})	+0.44

Details
Mass	1.81 M_{☉}
Radius	12.32 R_{☉}
Luminosity	66.0 L_{☉}
Surface gravity (log g)	2.53 cgs
Temperature	4.691 K
Metallicity [Fe/H]	+0.01 dex
Age	2.06 Gyr

Other designations
- Alkes, Alpha Crt, α Crt, 7 Crt, BD−17°3273, FK5 1283, HD 95272, HIP 53740, HR 4287, SAO 156375, LTT 4040, NLTT 25942

Database references
SIMBAD	data

Alpha Crateris is an orange-hued star in the southern constellation of Crater. It has the proper name Alkes, pronounced /ˈælkɛs/; Alpha Crateris is its Bayer designation. This is a cool giant star that is visible to the naked eye with an apparent visual magnitude of 4.07. Based on parallax measurements, it is located at a distance of approximately 160 light-years (49 pc) from the Earth. It is drifting further away with a line of sight velocity component of 47.5 km/s.

== Nomenclature ==
α Crateris (Latinised to Alpha Crateris) is the star's Bayer designation, abbreviated Alpha Crt or α Crt.

It bore the traditional name Alkes, from the Arabic الكاس alkās or الكأس alka's "the cup". In the catalogue of stars in the Calendarium of Al Achsasi al Mouakket, this star was designated Aoul al Batjna (أول ألباطیة awwal al-bāṭiya), which was translated into Latin as Prima Crateris, meaning "first [star] of the Cup". In 2016, the International Astronomical Union organized a Working Group on Star Names (WGSN) to catalogue and standardize proper names for stars. The WGSN approved the name Alkes for this star on 12 September 2016 and it is now so included in the List of IAU-approved Star Names.

In Chinese, 翼宿 (Yì Sù), meaning Wings (asterism), refers to an asterism consisting of Alpha Crateris, Gamma Crateris, Zeta Crateris, Lambda Crateris, Nu Hydrae, Eta Crateris, Delta Crateris, Iota Crateris, Kappa Crateris, Epsilon Crateris, HD 95808, HD 93833, Theta Crateris, HD 102574, HD 100219, Beta Crateris, HD 99922, HD 100307, HD 96819, Chi^{1} Hydrae, HD 102620 and HD 103462. Consequently, Alpha Crateris itself is known as 翼宿一 (Yì Sù yī, English: the First Star of Wings).

== Properties ==
Alpha Crateris is a giant star with a stellar classification of K1III, which suggests it has exhausted the supply of hydrogen at its core and evolved away from the main sequence. It is thought to be a horizontal branch star, meaning it is fusing helium in its core after a helium flash. Cool horizontal branch stars are often called red clump giants as they form a noticeable grouping near the hot edge of the red giant branch in the H–R diagrams of clusters with near-solar metallicity. On this basis it is calculated to have a mass of 1.81 M_{☉}, a luminosity of 66 L_{☉}, and an age around two billion years. Its effective temperature is 4691 K. Or it might be a red-giant branch star, still fusing hydrogen in a shell around an inert helium core, in which case it would be slightly less massive, older, cooler, larger, and more luminous.

=== Namesake ===
USS Alkes (AK-110) was a United States Navy Crater-class cargo ship named after the star.
