= Crater in Chinese astronomy =

According to traditional Chinese uranography, the modern constellation Crater is located within the southern quadrant of the sky, which is symbolized as the Vermilion Bird of the South (南方朱雀, Nán Fāng Zhū Què).

The name of the western constellation in modern Chinese is 巨爵座 (jù jué zuò), meaning "the huge wine holder constellation".

== Stars ==
The map of Chinese constellation in constellation Crater area consists of :

Four Symbols	Mansion (Chinese name)	Romanization	Translation	Asterisms (Chinese name)	Romanization	Translation	Western star name	Proper Name	Chinese star name	Romanization	Translation
Vermilion Bird of the South (南方朱雀)	翼	Yì	Wings	翼	Yì	Wings					
Vermilion Bird of the South (南方朱雀)	翼	Yì	Wings	翼	Yì	Wings	α Crt	Alkes			
Vermilion Bird of the South (南方朱雀)	翼	Yì	Wings	翼	Yì	Wings	α Crt	Alkes	翼宿一	Yìsùyī	1st star
Vermilion Bird of the South (南方朱雀)	翼	Yì	Wings	翼	Yì	Wings	α Crt	Alkes	翼宿距星	Yìsùjùxīng	Separated star
Vermilion Bird of the South (南方朱雀)	翼	Yì	Wings	翼	Yì	Wings	α Crt	Alkes	翼宿中央西第二星	Yìsùzhōngyāngxīdìèrxīng	2nd center western star
Vermilion Bird of the South (南方朱雀)	翼	Yì	Wings	翼	Yì	Wings	γ Crt		翼宿二	Yìsùèr	2nd star
Vermilion Bird of the South (南方朱雀)	翼	Yì	Wings	翼	Yì	Wings	ζ Crt		翼宿三	Yìsùsān	3rd star
Vermilion Bird of the South (南方朱雀)	翼	Yì	Wings	翼	Yì	Wings	λ Crt		翼宿四	Yìsùsì	4th star
Vermilion Bird of the South (南方朱雀)	翼	Yì	Wings	翼	Yì	Wings	η Crt		翼宿六	Yìsùliù	6th star
Vermilion Bird of the South (南方朱雀)	翼	Yì	Wings	翼	Yì	Wings	δ Crt		翼宿七	Yìsùqī	7th star
Vermilion Bird of the South (南方朱雀)	翼	Yì	Wings	翼	Yì	Wings	ι Crt		翼宿八	Yìsùbā	8th star
Vermilion Bird of the South (南方朱雀)	翼	Yì	Wings	翼	Yì	Wings	κ Crt		翼宿九	Yìsùjiǔ	9th star
Vermilion Bird of the South (南方朱雀)	翼	Yì	Wings	翼	Yì	Wings	ε Crt		翼宿十	Yìsùshí	10th star
Vermilion Bird of the South (南方朱雀)	翼	Yì	Wings	翼	Yì	Wings	HD 95808		翼宿十一	Yìsùshíyī	11th star
Vermilion Bird of the South (南方朱雀)	翼	Yì	Wings	翼	Yì	Wings	θ Crt		翼宿十三	Yìsùshísān	13th star
Vermilion Bird of the South (南方朱雀)	翼	Yì	Wings	翼	Yì	Wings	HD 102574		翼宿十四	Yìsùshísì	14th star
Vermilion Bird of the South (南方朱雀)	翼	Yì	Wings	翼	Yì	Wings	HD 100219		翼宿十五	Yìsùshíwǔ	15th star
Vermilion Bird of the South (南方朱雀)	翼	Yì	Wings	翼	Yì	Wings	β Crt		翼宿十六	Yìsùshíliù	16th star
Vermilion Bird of the South (南方朱雀)	翼	Yì	Wings	翼	Yì	Wings	HD 99922		翼宿十七	Yìsùshíqī	17th star

== See also ==
- Chinese astronomy
- Traditional Chinese star names
- Chinese constellations
