= Beta Crateris =

Binary star system in the constellation Crater

- Location of β Crateris (circled)

Observation data Epoch J2000.0 Equinox J2000.0 (ICRS)
- Constellation: Crater
- Right ascension: 11^{h} 11^{m} 39.479^{s}
- Declination: −22° 49′ 33.053″
- Apparent magnitude (V): 4.46 (4.61 + 13.40)

Characteristics
- Spectral type: A2 III + DA1.4
- U−B color index: +0.05
- B−V color index: +0.025±0.004

Astrometry
Radial velocity (R_{v})	+5.6±0.5 km/s
Proper motion (μ)	RA: +7.827 mas/yr Dec.: −102.911 mas/yr
Parallax (π)	10.3043±0.1166 mas
Distance	317 ± 4 ly (97 ± 1 pc)
Absolute magnitude (M_{V})	−0.62 + 8.19

Details
Luminosity	147 L_{☉}
Surface gravity (log g)	3.5 cgs
Temperature	8,830 K
Rotational velocity (v sin i)	49 km/s

β Crt B
Mass	0.43 M_{☉}
Radius	0.027 R_{☉}
Surface gravity (log g)	7.40 cgs
Temperature	36,885 K

Other designations
- β Crt, 11 Crateris, BD−22° 3095, FK5 421, GC 15385, HD 97277, HIP 54682, HR 4343, SAO 179624, WD 1109-225

Database references
SIMBAD	data

Beta Crateris is a binary star system in the southern constellation of Crater. Its name is a Bayer designation that is Latinized from β Crateris and abbreviated Beta Crt or β Crt. This system visible to the naked eye as a point of light with an apparent visual magnitude of 4.46. Based upon an annual parallax shift of 10.30 mas as seen from Earth, it is located at a distance of approximately 317 light-years (97 pc) from the Sun.

== Properties ==
This is an astrometric binary star system with an orbital period of 6.0 years and a projected separation of 8.3 AU. The orbit has an estimated semimajor axis of 9.3 AU. The primary component A is listed as an A-type giant star with a stellar classification of A2 III. However, Houk and Smith-Moore (1988) give a main sequence classification of A1 V, while Abt and Morrell (1995) list it as a subgiant star with a class of A2 IV. The spectrum shows enhanced barium, possibly as a result of a previous mass transfer event.

The companion, component B, is a white dwarf of class DA with an effective temperature of 36,885 K that has been cooling down for around four million years. It has an unusually low mass, 43% that of the Sun, suggesting that the white dwarf progenitor may have transferred matter to its companion. Alternative scenarios require either the evolution of a triple star system or a binary system with a highly eccentric orbit, resulting in grazing interactions. The dwarf is a source of X-ray emission.

== Name ==
This star was one of the sets assigned by the 16th-century astronomer Al Tizini to Al Sharāsīf (ألشراسيف), the Ribs (of Hydra), which included the stars from β Crateris westward through κ Hydrae.

According to the catalogue of stars in the Technical Memorandum 33-507 - A Reduced Star Catalog Containing 537 Named Stars, Al Sharāsīf were the titles for two stars: β Crateris as Al Sharasīf II and κ Hydrae as Al Sharasīf I.

In Chinese, 翼宿 (Yì Sù), meaning Wings (asterism), refers to an asterism consisting of β Crateris, α Crateris, γ Crateris, ζ Crateris, λ Crateris, ν Hydrae, η Crateris, δ Crateris, ι Crateris, κ Crateris, ε Crateris, HD 95808, HD 93833, θ Crateris, HD 102574, HD 100219, HD 99922, HD 100307, HD 96819, χ^{1} Hydrae, HD 102620 and HD 103462. Consequently, β Crateris itself is known as 翼宿十六 (Yì Sù shíliù, English: the Sixteenth Star of Wings.)
