= Phi Hydrae =

The Bayer designation Phi Hydrae (φ Hya / φ Hydrae) is shared by three star systems, in the constellation Hydra:

- φ^{1}
- φ^{2}
- φ^{3}

The three stars form a triangle between the brighter μ Hydrae and ν Hydrae.
