= USS Lynx (AK-100) =

Cargo ship of the United States Navy

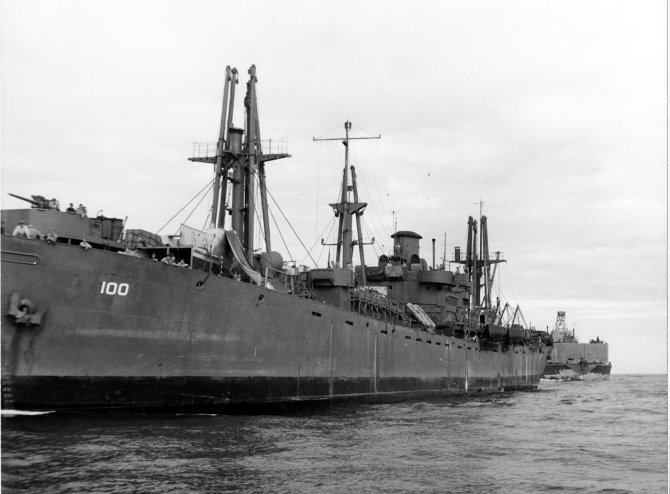
- Her "Liberty Ship" lines clearly apparent, USS Lynx (AK-100), part of a tank landing craft (LCT) secured as deck cargo forward, delivers Section 13 of the advanced base sectional dock ABSD-1 at Palikulo Bay, Espiritu Santo, 1 February 1944.

History

United States
- Name: Juan Bautista de Anza; Lynx
- Namesake: Juan Bautista de Anza; The constellation Lynx
- Ordered: as a Type EC2-S-C1 hull, MCE hull 1657
- Builder: California Shipbuilding Corporation, Terminal Island, Los Angeles, California
- Yard number: 190
- Way number: 10
- Laid down: 26 April 1943
- Launched: 18 May 1943
- Commissioned: 26 July 1943
- Decommissioned: 1 November 1945
- Renamed: Lynx, 27 May 1943
- Stricken: 16 November 1945
- Identification: Hull symbol: AK-100; Code letters: NAXK
- Honors and awards: 1 × battle star
- Fate: Sold for scrapping, 3 October 1972, withdrawn, 10 November 1972

General characteristics
- Class & type: Crater-class cargo ship
- Type: Type EC2-S-C1
- Displacement: 4,023 long tons (4,088 t) (standard); 14,550 long tons (14,780 t) (full load)
- Length: 441 ft 6 in (134.57 m)
- Beam: 56 ft 11 in (17.35 m)
- Draft: 28 ft 4 in (8.64 m)
- Installed power: 2 × Oil fired 450 °F (232 °C) boilers, operating at 220 psi (1,500 kPa) , (manufactured by Babcock & Wilcox); 2,500 shp (1,900 kW)
- Propulsion: 1 × Vertical triple-expansion reciprocating steam engine, (manufactured by Joshua Hendy); 1 × screw propeller
- Speed: 12.5 kn (23.2 km/h; 14.4 mph)
- Capacity: 7,800 t (7,700 long tons) DWT; 444,206 cu ft (12,578.5 m^{3}) (non-refrigerated)
- Complement: 24 officers 214 enlisted
- Armament: 1 × 5 in (127 mm)/38 caliber dual-purpose (DP) gun; 1 × 3 in (76 mm)/50 caliber DP gun; 2 × 40 mm (1.57 in) Bofors anti-aircraft (AA) gun mounts; 6 × 20 mm (0.79 in) Oerlikon cannon AA gun mounts

USS Lynx (AK-100) was a Crater-class cargo ship commissioned by the US Navy for service in World War II. Lynx was the third US Navy vessel to bear the name, but unlike previous ships this one was named after the constellation Lynx. She was responsible for delivering troops, goods and equipment to locations in the Asiatic-Pacific Theater.

== Construction ==
Lynx was laid down 26 April 1943, under a Maritime Commission (MARCOM) contract, MC hull No. 1657, as the Liberty ship SS Juan Bautista de Anza, by California Shipbuilding Corporation, Terminal Island, Los Angeles, California; launched 18 May 1943; sponsored by Mrs. E. E. McCarty; renamed Lynx 27 May 1943; and commissioned 26 July 1943.

== Service history ==
=== 1943 ===
After fitting out, Lynx reported on 6 August 1943, to the Commandant, Twelfth Naval district, for assignment to the Naval Transportation Service (NTS), Lynx loaded cargo at San Francisco and departed for the western Pacific 28 August 1943, in Convoy PW 2294. Proceeding via Espiritu Santo, in the New Hebrides, the new cargo vessel touched at Auckland, New Zealand, 26 October, and Rarotonga, 2 November, then returned to Espiritu Santo en route back to the west coast of the United States.

Completing an overhaul at the Hurley Marine Works, Oakland, California, on 7 December 1943, Lynx shifted to berth no.3, Encinal Terminal, Alameda, California, later the same day, and began loading cargo. After completing that process on 15 December, the ship moved to Pier 54N at San Francisco, taking on board a deck cargo of a Landing Craft Tank (LCT), a Landing Craft Mechanized (LCM), and three Landing Craft Personnel (LCV(P)), vehicle and personnel landing craft, 15–17 December.

Lynx cleared San Francisco Bay on 17 December 1943, for towing tests in accordance with the movement orders from Commander Joseph J. Rochefort, the commanding officer of ABSD-2. Subsequently, the cargo ship carried out her assigned evolutions, 18–20 December, towing section A of ABD-20, escorted by the fleet tug Munsee and salvage vessel Escape, dropping anchor in Berth 68, San Francisco Bay, 20 December. She remained there through Christmas of 1943.

=== 1944 ===
==== Emergency surgery ====
On 27 December 1943, Lynx, with Section 13 of the advanced base sectional dock ABSD-1 in tow astern, sailed as flagship of Task Group (TG) 116.15.3, Commander Arthur S. Walton, in company with sister ships Lyra, towing ARD-12, and Sculptor, with YRD(H)-1 astern, and Albireo, towing YRD(M)-1, escorted by the fleet tug Zuni, set course for the South Pacific. During the afternoon watch on 14 January 1944, Zuni left her position in the formation and came alongside, transferring Sea1c Hugh W. Morris, diagnosed with appendicitis, to Lynx, for medical treatment. Lieutenant Herman E. Wuestenfeld, MC-V(G), (Note: MC-V(G) Officers of the Volunteer Reserve appointed for general service in the Medical Corps.) the cargo ship's medical officer, performed an appendectomy later that same day, 20:34-21:40.

==== Man overboard ====
Less than an hour before the end of the forenoon watch, 11:03, on 18 January 1944, Sea2c Maurice L. Bosshart, V-6, USNR, a passenger traveling in Lynx for further transportation to YRD(M)-1 for duty, fell overboard. Thirty seconds after Bosshart was reported over the side, Lynx ran up her “five” flag at the dip and dropped two life rings and a Franklin life buoy within 50 yd (46 m) of him. Zuni left the formation at 11:04 to conduct a search, while Lynx signaled her tow to look for the man and put life rings in the water. Sailors on board section 13 of the advanced base sectional dock ABSD-1, however, reported that they had lost sight of him. The following day, 19 January, Lynx held a memorial service for Sea2c Bosshart at 09:30.

==== New Hebrides ====
On 22 January 1944, the submarine chasers PC-584 and PC-596 joined as additional escorts, and two days later the destroyer escort Spangler joined the convoy as escort commander. The assemblage of ships and yard craft crossed the 180th meridian on 25 January, losing 26 January, in the process. Shortly before the end of the first dog watch on 28 January, at 17:55, Lynx embarked Sergeant Claude E. Rudy, USMC, a passenger in the tug Zuni, who had been diagnosed with appendicitis. Ultimately, TG 116.15.3 reached its destination, Espiritu Santo, on 1 February, standing in to Pallikula Bay.

Delivering her tow upon arrival, Lynx shifted to Segond Channel, Espiritu Santo, 2 February 1944, and transferred Sgt. Rudy and Sea1c Morris, the two recovering appendicitis patients, back to Zuni, while the tug returned the cargo ship's Franklin life buoy that had been put in the water during the unsuccessful attempt to save Sea2c Bosshart. She also began discharging and unloading cargo over the next few days, 3–4 February. Lynx returned to Pallikula Bay on the morning of 5 February, then sailed for Efate, New Hebrides, later the same day, escorted by the district patrol vessel YP-416, arriving on 6 February. After discharging cargo at Vila Harbor, Efate, 6–7 February, Lynx shifted to Havannah Harbor, Efate, 8 February, where she completed the unloading process, 8–10 February. She set course for Espiritu Santo on 10 February, and anchored upon arrival the following day. After a wait, 11–15 February, for dock space, Lynx completed discharging cargo on 21 February, moving away from the pier where she had been moored to return to an anchorage, assisted in the evolution by Rail and harbor tug YT-153.

==== Towing duty ====
Sailing on 23 February 1944, in company with Fort McHenry, Lynx set course to return to San Francisco, escorted by PC-598. With the little convoy dispersed on 24 February, the cargo vessel received instructions to divert her course south of the Fiji Islands the following day. She crossed the International Date Line on 28 February, and ultimately stood in to the naval anchorage at San Francisco on 17 March. She shifted to Pier 18 North the following day to discharge cargo, 18–19 March, then returned to the Encinal Terminal at Alameda, 21–28 March. She loaded cargo at Alameda and at Pier 50B, San Francisco, 29 March–1 April.

Underway on 1 April 1944, Lynx steamed to San Pedro, California, 3–4 April. Picking up her tow, the fuel oil barge YO-184, Lynx sailed for Pearl Harbor on 4 April. Relieved of her tow on 17 April, the cargo ship put into Pearl and moored at berth K-1, Naval Supply Depot, where she began discharging cargo. She shifted to berth V-2 off Pearl City on 19 April, to continue that work, completing it on 22 April, at which point she began to load cargo. Sailing for Hilo, Territory of Hawaii, on 25 April, her holds full, she arrived at her destination on the following day. Discharging cargo there until 28 April, she sailed that day to return to the west coast of the United States.

Lynx stood in to San Francisco Bay on 6 May 1944, and anchored. Underway two days later, she moored at Pier 25, San Francisco, on 8 May, where she began a period of minor repairs and alterations in the hands of the General Engineering Co. on 9 May. Shifting to the General Engineering & Drydock Company's yard at Alameda, on 16 May, she entered the floating dry dock YFD-19, where her bottom was scraped and painted and paravane gear installed, 16–19 May. Underway once more on 20 May, Lynx fueled at the Point Orient Fuel Dock that same day, then put into Port Chicago to load cargo at the Naval Magazine there 20–28 May. Shifting to Pier 92, San Francisco, on 28 May, she continued to receive minor repairs and alterations through the end of the month, such work being completed on 31 May, when she also completed loading her holds. She completed loading deck cargo, LCT-1096 and five re-arming boats, on 1 June, then proceeded to the Tiburon anchorage, San Francisco Bay, on 2 June.

Lieutenant Commander William N. Price reported on board Lynx on 3 June 1944, as Commander Task Unit 116.15.1, and the ship sailed that day as his flagship, towing Section 10 (“H”) of ABSD-2, in company with her old convoy-mate Sculptor—towing Section 3 (“I”) of ABSD-2; cargo ship Eridanus – towing Section 21 (“J”) of ABSD-2; and the tug Point Arguello towing Section 4 (“G”) of ABSD-2. The rescue tug ATR-25, with YF-591 in tow, rounded out Convoy PW 2411. Two days into the voyage, ATR-25 transferred her tow to Point Arguello, and assumed duty as retriever vessel. Later in the passage, on 23 June, Lt. Cmdr. Price detached ATR-25 to proceed to Pago Pago, Tutuila, Samoa, “to refuel and transact official business for Task Unit 116.15.1.” Her mission completed, the rescue tug rejoined the convoy on 27 June, then conducted a round trip to Pago Pago. She was detached “to proceed on duty assigned” on 28 June. Convoy PW-2411 continued on its voyage into July, skipping 3 July 1944, as the ships travelled east to west. The tug Race Point joined the assemblage on 11 July, as retriever, then left “in accordance with verbal instructions of [the] Convoy Commodore…” on 13 July, returning on 15 July, shortly before the convoy stood in to Seeadler Harbor, Manus.

Underway for New Guinea on 18 July 1944, Lynx proceeded with Sculptor, convoy commander, Eridanus, and the War Shipping Administration (WSA) troopship, Dutch registry, Kota Inten, escorted by HMAS Geelong and HMAS Glenelg. The last-three named ships received orders to proceed independently on 19 July, while the three American cargo ships continued on, arriving at Milne Bay on 21 July. Fueling alongside Clyde, 23 July, Lynx unloaded her deck cargo, LCT-1096 and the re-arming boats, on 26 July, then got underway for Queensland, Australia, later the same morning.

Lynx arrived at Brisbane on 31 July 1944, and immediately commenced unloading cargo. Bringing that task to completion on 4 August, and beginning the loading process, the cargo ship sailed for Sydney, New South Wales, on 8 August. Reaching port on 10 August, she discharged the materials brought from Brisbane at Darling Harbour, 10–14 August, Pyrmont, 14–21 August, and Glebe Island, 21 August, then loaded a cargo at the last-named Sydney location 21–25 August, completing that work an hour after the end of the mid watch that day. She sailed for Oahu on 26 August. Reaching Pearl Harbor on 10 September, Lynx moored alongside the freighter John Lind at berth X-10, and unloaded all cargo earmarked for Pearl the following day between 13:55 and 23:00. She then sailed for the west coast on 12 September.

Bringing another voyage to a close on 20 September 1944, when she dropped anchor in San Francisco Bay, Lynx unloaded cargo alongside Pier 18 North, 21–26 September, then steamed to the yard of the Cortola Company's, Marine Ways, Inc., Oakland, where she underwent repairs and alterations into the first week of October. Completing her availability at the Cortola yard on 6 October, Lynx steamed to Pier 48-B, San Francisco, where she loaded cargo until 14 October. Underway to calibrate her radio direction finder that afternoon, she anchored in San Francisco Bay when that task was done, pausing only until the morning of 16 October, when she sailed for Oahu, Lynx, convoy commander, taking departure with Lignite in tow and accompanied by YF-450.

Letting go her tow shortly before mid day on 28 October 1944, off the entrance to the Pearl Harbor entrance channel, releasing Lignite “into the care of pilot and tugs,” Lynx directed YF-450 to proceed independently, then moored at berth K-5 soon thereafter. She unloaded cargo at X-5 until 7 November, at which point she shifted berths to X-11, mooring alongside Durham Wright at 09:47, that ship's place taken by another freighter, Joel Palmer, at 18:12. The following afternoon, 8 November 1944, Lynx got underway for San Francisco, taking station in Convoy PS 160T with the convoy commander in the transport U. S. Grant, the C1–B troopship Cape Cleare, Gulf Caribbean, Permanente, and Duala', escorted by the frigate Rockford and the minesweeper Ardent.

==== Japanese submarine attack ====
PS-160T's voyage proceeded without incident until 12:32 on 13 November 1944, some 100 mi (160 km) west-southwest of Los Angeles, Calif., Ardent's sonar picked up a submarine contact. The minesweeper attacked, firing a 24-charge “hedgehog” pattern, and followed that up with a second pattern at 12:46. Rockford left her escort station to assist, and fired her first barrage of rockets from her “hedgehog” at 13"08. Two explosions followed, before an underwater detonation rocked the ship. While the ships in company took evasive action on signal from the convoy commodore in U. S. Grant, Ardent carried out two more attacks and the frigate dropped 13 depth charges. Wreckage recovered on the scene—deck planks, ground cork covered with diesel oil, a wooden slat from a vegetable crate with Japanese writing and advertisements on it, pieces of varnished mahogany inscribed in Japanese, and a piece of deck planking containing Japanese builders’ inscriptions—indicated a definite “kill” that the Navy ultimately awarded to Ardent and Rockford equally.

Postwar research revealed the sunken boat to be Japanese submarine I-12, Commander Kudo Kaneo, that had sailed from the Inland Sea on 4 October 1944, to disrupt American shipping between the west coast and the Hawaiian Islands. In sinking I-12, Ardent and Rockford avenged the atrocity I-12 had committed on 30 October, when, after sinking the freighter John A. Johnson with two torpedoes, the submarine had rammed and sunk the lifeboats and rafts and then employed machine guns and pistols on the 70 survivors. Among the ten men slain were five sailors of the merchantman's US Navy Armed Guard. There were no survivors from I-12's 114 officers and men.

=== End of 1944 ===
Lynx relieved U. S. Grant as convoy commander, in accordance with orders from Commander, Western Sea Frontier, on 15 November 1944, and the following day the venerable transport and Gulf Caribbean proceeded independently. Putting into San Francisco two days later, 17 November, the ship unloaded cargo over ensuing days, completing the evolutions on 21 November, when she shifted from the familiar confines of Pier 18 North to the Naval Supply Depot, tying up at Berth B and beginning the loading process immediately thereafter on 21 November. Tugs shifted Lynx's berth to Berth C on the following day and she continued the loading there, a process she carried on into the first week of December. LCT-1355 was loaded on board as deck cargo on 2 December, and Lynx moved out to the naval anchorage the next day, where she secured a towing cable to YF-746. The ship then sailed for Oahu at 13:20.

Arriving off Pearl Harbor on 12 December 1944, Lynx cast YF-746 loose then proceeded to berth X-8, mooring alongside Manderson Victory, that got underway from there on 14 December, permitting the unloading of the tank landing craft that Lynx had brought from the west coast. Shifting to berth X-22 on 16 December, then to B-12 three days before Christmas, Lynx loaded four motor torpedo boats (PT) from Motor Torpedo Boat Squadron 17 on 22 December: PT-225, PT-226, PT-229, and PT-232. After a brief period moored alongside the freighter Edwin M. Stanton at X-10, 23–25 December, Lynx then sailed for the Admiralty Islands on 27 December, two days after Christmas.

=== 1945 ===
Again losing a day, 3 January 1945, by virtue of the passage westward, Lynx stood in to Seeadler Harbor during the first dog watch on 11 January, anchoring in Berth 24. Once there she took on board a cargo of mail between 12:35 and 13:00 on 14 January, then sailed for Dutch New Guinea a little over five hours later. She discharged her cargo of mail at Humboldt Bay, 16:00-16:31 on 16 January, and remained anchored there until shifting berths on 25 January, prior to her sailing in convoy for the Philippines later that same day.

With the convoy commodore riding in Lynx and the vice-commodore in the auxiliary tug ATA-177, the assembly of ships proceeded on their voyage with Pratt and Rombach and PC-1134 carrying out anti-submarine patrolling on the starboard and port flanks, and ahead, respectively. One day out, Lynx took a crash boat in tow astern of YO-164, 26 January 1945, and on 27 January, the old tug (ex-minesweeper) Lark reported boiler trouble beyond the scope of underway repair, so she was detached to proceed independently to Mios Woendi. Detached two hours into the mid watch on 28 January, PC-1134 proceeded ahead to rendezvous with additional ships slated to join the convoy off Biak. The submarine chaser returned, shepherding her new charges, that afternoon, and after towing assignments with the new arrivals had been taken-up, the convoy resumed its slow speed of advance, 5 kn (9.3 km/h; 5.8 mph), at 23:38, bound for the Philippine Islands.

Reaching San Pedro Bay, Leyte, half-way through the morning watch on 5 February 1945, the convoy dispersed shortly after its arrival, Lynx turning over YO-164 to the rescue tugs ATR-36 and ATR-86 before dropping anchor in berth 91. The following morning, 6 February, Lynx got underway and moored alongside the motor torpedo boat tender Cyrene in berth 215 and discharged PT-226 and PT-229. Then, after spending the night at anchor in berth 214, again came alongside Cyrene at 08:30 on 7 February. The cargo ship discharged PT-232 and PT-225 at that time, then proceeded back to berth 214 and dropped anchor there.

Steaming thence to Guiuan Harbor, Samar, Lynx discharged cargo there, 11 February–9 March 1945, before returning to San Pedro Bay on 10 March. She got underway at 08:00 on 13 March, in accordance with orders from the Port Director at Tolosa Beach, Leyte, to rendezvous with Convoy IG 103, thence to proceed to Hollandia. Almost three hours into her voyage, however, Lynx received a dispatch from Commander Task Force 75, in accordance with which she reversed course and returned to San Pedro Bay, dropping anchor in berth 484, upon arrival.

Lynx shifted her anchorage within the confines of San Pedro Bay on 15 March 1945, and remained in berth 31 for almost a fortnight, accomplishing “urgent machinery repairs.” After fueling from the station tanker Gazelle, 28 March, and taking on fresh water from the distilling ship Wildcat, 29 March, she proceeded to Dulag, Leyte, on 31 March. Lynx soon began loading cargo, an evolution she continued into the second week of April, after which time she shifted berths, 6 April, and embarked the US Army’s 866th Anti-Aircraft Battery headquarters unit and its equipment, 7 April, for transportation to Okinawa. Lynx then sailed for the Western Carolines, escorted by the destroyer Coghlan in TU 75.2.19.

Dropping anchor at Ulithi on 13 April 1945, Lynx fueled from Signal the following morning, 14 April, then took on stores and accomplished minor repairs, 15–19 April, before getting underway in Ulithi-Okinawa Convoy UOK 2 on 20 April, the vice-commodore riding in the ship, and the commodore in Carina, accompanied by refrigerated store ship Adria, cargo ships Cetus, De Grasse and Kenmore, net-laying ship Winterberry, flotilla flagships LC(FF)-532 and LC(FF)-536, the tank landing craft LCT-708, large support landing craft LCS(L)-23, degaussing vessel YDG-10 and five freighters, escorted by Ralph Talbot, Oliver Mitchell and high speed transport Schley, Captain Glenn R. Hartwig in tactical command, in Compton.

==== Another submarine scare ====
A quarter of an hour into the second dog watch on 24 April 1945, Ralph Talbot left the convoy to investigate a submarine contact. Three hours into the mid watch on 25 April, the convoy received a Commander Task Force 51 secret dispatch “warning of submarine activity in our immediate vicinity.” Ordered to divert from their present course and “to proceed via new reference points” to their destination, UOK 2 did so. Ralph Talbot rejoined the assemblage at the start of the second dog watch later that day. The warning may have been related to the activities of the Japanese submarine RO-109, Lt. Nakagawa Hiroshi, which was sunk with all hands, 56 dead all told, by the high speed transport Horace A. Bass, that was escorting another Okinawa-bound convoy, after three attacks during the second dog watch on 25 April.

==== Okinawa ====
===== Enemy plane threats =====
UOK 2 arrived off Okinawa at 11:25 on 26 April 1945. With the dissolution of the convoy, the ships proceeded independently, Lynx anchoring in berth 140. She soon began discharging cargo into lighters alongside, a task interrupted by a Flash Red at 02:20 on 27 April. The vessel went to general quarters and began making smoke, but although enemy planes were nearby, she sighted none. With the raid over in about a quarter of an hour, the ship resumed unloading. Later that day, however, at 20:40, a Flash Red sent Lynx's men back to general quarters for the second time that day. Ships in the vicinity, as well as shore defenses, shot down an aircraft identified as a Betty (twin-engine, land-based bomber), splashing it about 1,000 yd (910 m) on Lynx's port beam.

Lynx stayed at battle stations, with Japanese planes reported overhead and “suicide boats at large in the anchorage,” through the mid watch on 28 April 1945, her sailors noting “considerable rifle fire from nearby ships...presumed to be shots fired at possible suicide [assault demolition] boats.” With receipt of a Flash White at 04:16, the ship secured from general quarters and ceased making smoke, the continued discharging cargo into lighters alongside. Two more Flash Reds occurred during the day, 16:05–16:46 and beginning at 19:32, with a 3-inch (76 mm)/50 caliber shell, identified afterwards by the fuse setting ring found on deck, exploding near Lynx's port beam at 21:40 “throwing shrapnel about the decks and causing a slight facial injury to one man.”

Again, Lynx remained at general quarters into another mid watch. Securing from battle stations at 02:25 on 29 April 1945, after receiving a Flash White, the ship stood to general quarters three more times that day, 04:29–05:10, 07:51–08:03 and 21:05–23:58, continuing the unloading process in between the first two alarums, 05:10-07:51. She received Flash Red alerts twice during the mid and morning watches on 30 April, 00:45–01:22, and 02:00–05:58, discharging cargo to lighters alongside as before after the latter. A third Flash Red occurred during the first watch, 22:12–23:20.

At month's end, Lt. Cmdr. Berrey reported that winds of “force 2 to 3 or greater, decidedly reduced the effectiveness of the smoke screen” laid in the anchorage. Lynx's smoke boat—a rebuilt LCV(P) “reclaimed from a boat pool scrap heap”—managed to cover large holes in the screen, but only “with difficulty.” He also noted that “attempts to guide the smoke boats on their patrol...were made by ringing the ship’s bell, and later by using a fog horn on the bow,” but similar measures by other ships in the area rendered both expedients “more or less unsatisfactory.” Additionally, “rifle fire from various ships in the harbor, during smoke screening, aimed at supposed Japanese suicide boats, frequently endangered our smoke boats.”

Lynx went to general quarters upon receipt of a Flash Red at the end the mid watch on 1 May 1945, and began making smoke. With a Flash White at 04:41, the ship secured her smoke-making, stood down from battle stations, and soon resumed the unloading process. Later that morning, she transferred 400 rounds of 40-millimetre (1.57 in) ammunition to the Landing Ship Medium LSM-322, and that afternoon provided diesel fuel to the tank landing craft LCT-1237. Completing her unloading during the mid watch, 01:42, on 2 May, Lynx disembarked the soldiers of the 866th AA Battalion at 08:00.

Shifting her berth the following morning, 3 May 1945, Lynx provided 40-millimeter ammunition to the Landing Ship Medium (Rocket) LSM(R)-192 an hour before the end of the forenoon watch. Intensifying Japanese aerial activity midway through the second dog watch on 3 May, prompted a Flash Red at 19:05, with enemy planes active not only over the anchorage but over Yontan Airfield as well. The interlude lasted less than an hour, with a Flash White being sent at 20:01.

===== Suicide boat threats =====
The threat posed by the Japanese assault demolition boats proved very real. Early in the mid watch on 4 May 1945, one of the ships in Lynx's task unit, her sister ship Carina, was hit by a suicide boat. A Flash Red at 02:04 sent ships in the vicinity back to general quarters and making smoke, evolutions ended with a Flash White at 04:52. Underway at 07:41 to rendezvous with Ulithi-bound Convoy OKU 3, Lynx went to general quarters upon receipt of a Flash Red ten minutes into her voyage, 07:51, remaining at battle stations through her rendezvous with the convoy one hour later. Standing down from general quarters at 09:24, the cargo ship took departure from Okinawa at 09:35. Another Flash Red, however, came through within a quarter of an hour, with Lynx noting shipping under attack and antiaircraft fire shooting down several planes. OKU-3 escaped unscathed and proceeded on its voyage unmolested, reaching Ulithi at mid-day on 9 May.

==== Tow duty ====
After taking on fresh water from Abatan and fuel from tanker Chotauk on 11 May 1945, Lynx sailed for the west coast of the United States the following morning. The passage proved uneventful until 27 May, when the ship steamed past Oahu. “While proceeding on [the] routing prescribed in [the] basis sailing directions,” Lt. Cmdr. Berrey wrote later, “several radical course changes were made to give bombing target towing vessels a wide berth. Both vessels were operating well outside of the restricted zone, which is provided for such operations, at Kaneohe Bay, but both showed an utter disregard for the rules of the road and safety at sea, by apparent unnecessary re-crossing this vessel’s bow.”

Reaching San Francisco with no further incident on 4 June 1945, Lynx anchored upon arrival and remained there until 8 June, when she shifted to Moore's Dry Dock Company's Oakland yard. After undergoing repairs and alterations, 9–19 June, the ship then returned to the Encinal Terminal on 20 June, and began loading cargo the following day. Completing those evolutions on 28 June, she moved out into the naval anchorage later that same day.

Shifting to the Tiburon anchorage during the afternoon watch on 1 July 1945, Lynx secured a towing hawser to section 51 of ABSD-7, along with covered lighter YF-1013, at 11:06 the following morning, 2 July, and a little under seven hours later took departure from San Francisco in Convoy FE 3 (TU 06.12.15), with Capt. Lyell St.L. Pamperin, the convoy commodore, on board. The tug Hillsboro Inlet, towing open lighter YC-1142 and covered lighters YF-1012 and YF-1014, accompanied the cargo ship and her tows, with the salvage vessel Protector in the role of retriever. Derangement to her anchor windlass prevented the tug Point Arena, with her tows, section 52 of ABSD-7 and YF-1012, from getting underway with the convoy as it put to sea, bound for the Marshall Islands.

Six days out, Protector left the convoy and guided Point Arena and her tows to join up with FE-3, 8 July 1945, and the voyage toward Eniwetok continued, the little assemblage crossing the International Date Line on 25 July. On the afternoon of 28 July, Lynx transferred Lt. Wuestenfeld, her medical officer, to Hillsboro Inlet to treat a sick sailor, but the remainder of the voyage proceeded uneventfully, FE-3 reaching Eniwetok on the morning of 2 August. Medium harbor tug YTM-471 relieved Lynx of YF-1013, while section 51 of ABSD-7 cut loose the towing cable and came to anchor.

Lynx fueled from YO-182 soon after her arrival on 2 August 1945, and after her departure had been delayed one day, sailed for Majuro Atoll, in the Marshalls, on the morning of 4 August. Reaching her destination three days later, she began discharging cargo alongside Rita Pier, Darrit Island, soon after her arrival, and continued the unloading process into 13 August, when she sailed for Kwajalein Atoll, also in the Marshalls, arriving the next day to begin discharging cargo into lighters tied up alongside off the island of Roi, until 19 August. Lynx continued the unloading process at Kwajalein, to which she had moved later on 19 August into 21 August. The following day, she loaded empty gasoline and fuel oil drums into her number two and four holds. She completed that process, as well as the discharge of all cargo, on 23 August. The following morning, 24 August, Lynx got underway to return to San Francisco.

==== Final return to San Francisco ====
Lynx dropped anchor in San Francisco Bay on 11 September 1945, then moved to Pier 18 before the day was out. Moving back out into the anchorage on 13 September, the cargo ship then proceeded to Hurley Marine Works four days later, to be docked on the marine railway there. Her overhaul proceeded over the ensuing days, the ship clearing dry dock on 27 September, to moor at Pier No. 3 at the Hurley facility, where she remained moored, undergoing the decommissioning process in the wake of the Office of the Chief of Naval Operations (OpNav) despatch of 26 September, that ordered the vessel's inactivation, through the end of October.

=== Decommissioning ===
Underway at the start of the forenoon watch on 1 November 1945, Lynx steamed to Suisun Bay, California, where she dropped anchor in anchorage 26, berth E-14, tying up alongside the freighter Charles M. McGroarty at 11:19. Representatives of the War Shipping Administration (WSA) then signed papers accepting the vessel from the Navy, and Lynx was decommissioned at 12:30. She entered the Reserve Fleet the same day, and her name was stricken from the Naval Register on 16 November 1945.

=== Fate ===
Resuming her original name, Juan Bautista de Anza, the ship remained in reserve until purchased by Union Minerals and Alloys Corporation, for non-transportation use (NTU), on 3 October 1972, for $40,000.00. She was physically removed from the Reserve Fleet on 10 November 1972.

== Awards ==
Lynx received one battle star for World War II service in the capture and occupation of Okinawa Gunto.

== Notes ==
Citations

== Bibliography ==
Online resources

- Cressman, Robert J. (11 July 2016). "Lynx III (AK-100)". Dictionary of American Naval Fighting Ships. Naval History and Heritage Command. This article incorporates text from this source, which is in the public domain.
- "California Shipbuilding, Los Angeles CA". www.ShipbuildingHistory.com. 13 October 2010.
- "USS Lynx (AK-100)". NavSource. 26 August 2016.
- "JUAN BAUTISTA DE ANZA". United States Department of Transportation. Archived from the original on December 12, 2019.
- "Summary of Ranks and Rates of the U.S. Navy". Bureau of Naval Personnel. May 1943.
