= Phi1 Hydrae =

Star in the constellation Hydra

Phi^{1} Hydrae
Observation data Epoch J2000.0 Equinox J2000.0 (ICRS)
- Constellation: Hydra
- Right ascension: 10^{h} 32^{m} 41.15960^{s}
- Declination: −16° 57′ 31.4112″
- Apparent magnitude (V): 7.61

Characteristics
- Evolutionary stage: subgiant
- Spectral type: G2 V

Astrometry
Radial velocity (R_{v})	+15.8±0.3 km/s
Proper motion (μ)	RA: −20.964 mas/yr Dec.: −87.870 mas/yr
Parallax (π)	12.3313±0.0315 mas
Distance	264.5 ± 0.7 ly (81.1 ± 0.2 pc)
Absolute magnitude (M_{V})	+3.30

Details
Mass	1.12 M_{☉}
Radius	2.1 R_{☉}
Luminosity	5.0 L_{☉}
Surface gravity (log g)	3.86 cgs
Temperature	6,023 K
Metallicity [Fe/H]	+0.15±0.05 dex
Age	4.1 Gyr

Other designations
- φ^{1} Hya, 43 Hydrae, BD−16°3078, HD 91369, HIP 51614, SAO 156047

Database references
SIMBAD	data

Phi^{1} Hydrae, Latinized from φ^{1} Hydrae, is a yellow-hued star in the constellation Hydra. Its apparent magnitude is 7.61, making it too faint to be seen with the naked eye. Based upon an annual parallax shift of 12.3 mas as seen from Earth, it is located about 264 light-years from the Sun. It forms a triangle with the brighter φ^{2} Hydrae and φ^{3} Hydrae, between μ Hydrae and ν Hydrae.

Phi^{1} Hydrae is an ordinary G-type main-sequence star, having a Sun-like stellar classification of G2 V and a photospheric temperature only slightly higher than the sun. However, the mass is 34% greater than the Sun's, and it is radiating five times the Sun's luminosity. Phi^{1} Hydrae is moving further from the Sun with a radial velocity of +15.8 km/s.
