= Phi2 Hydrae =

Star in the constellation Hydra

Phi^{2} Hydrae
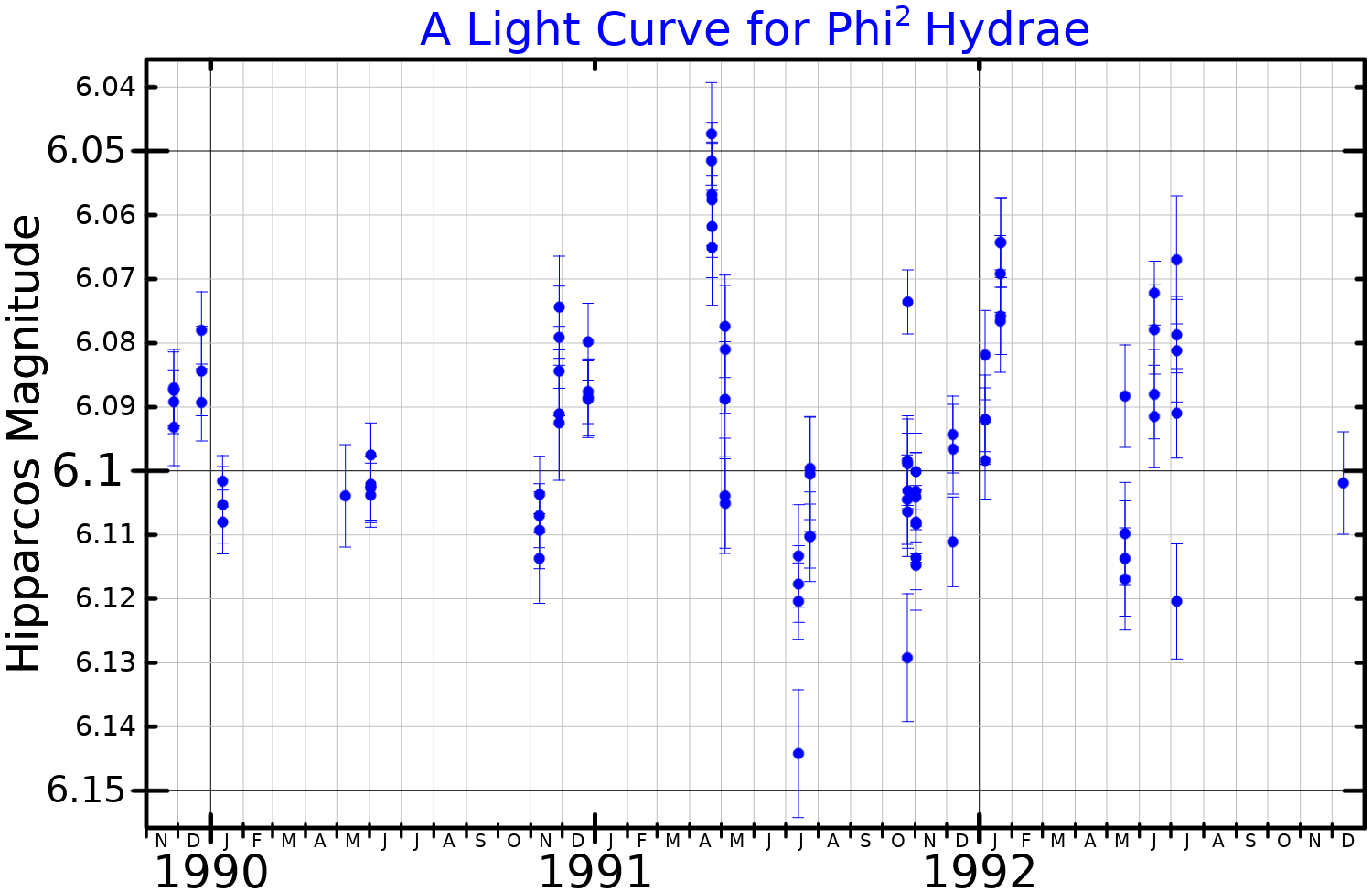
- A light curve for Phi^{2} Hydrae, plotted from Hipparcos data

Observation data Epoch J2000.0 Equinox J2000.0 (ICRS)
- Constellation: Hydra
- Right ascension: 10^{h} 36^{m} 16.65890^{s}
- Declination: −16° 20′ 39.5764″
- Apparent magnitude (V): 5.97 to 6.04

Characteristics
- Evolutionary stage: AGB
- Spectral type: M1 III
- U−B color index: +1.95
- B−V color index: +1.64
- Variable type: SR

Astrometry
Radial velocity (R_{v})	+15.7±2.9 km/s
Proper motion (μ)	RA: −30.651 mas/yr Dec.: +4.212 mas/yr
Parallax (π)	2.929±0.1349 mas
Distance	1,110 ± 50 ly (340 ± 20 pc)
Absolute magnitude (M_{V})	−0.80

Details
Mass	6.4 M_{☉}
Radius	85 R_{☉}
Luminosity	1,470 L_{☉}
Surface gravity (log g)	1.25 cgs
Temperature	3,873 K

Other designations
- φ^{2} Hya, BD−15°3087, HD 91880, HIP 51905, HR 4156, SAO 156093

Database references
SIMBAD	data

Phi^{2} Hydrae, Latinized from φ^{2} Hydrae, is a star in the constellation Hydra. It originally received the Flamsteed designation of 1 Crateris before being placed in Hydra. Based upon an annual parallax shift of 2.9 mas as seen from Earth, it is located roughly 1,110 light years from the Sun. The star is faintly visible to the naked eye with an apparent visual magnitude of about six. It forms a triangle with the fainter φ^{1} Hydrae and the brighter φ^{3} Hydrae, between μ Hydrae and ν Hydrae.

Pulsations
Period (days)	Amplitude (magnitude)
11.0	0.008
110.3	0.012
153.6	0.015

This is an evolved red giant star with a stellar classification of M1 III. It is currently on the asymptotic giant branch, and is a semiregular variable that undergoes changes in luminosity according to three pulsation periods, although it is formally still only a suspected variable. The star is radiating an estimated 1,470 times the Sun's luminosity from its photosphere at an effective temperature of 3,873 K.

Phi^{2} Hydrae has a faint visual companion: a magnitude 12.20 star at an angular separation of 3.50 arc seconds along a position angle of 280°, as of 1959. The companion has a similar Gaia Data Release 3 parallax to Phi^{2} Hydrae and is at a distance of 329+5
−4 pc.
