= USS Alkes =

Cargo ship of the United States Navy

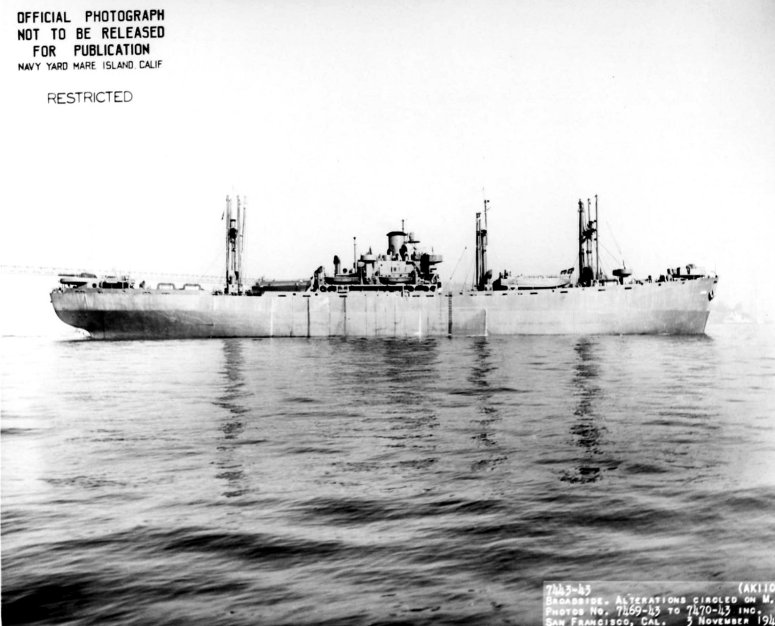
- USS Alkes (AK-110) (broadside view) off San Francisco, 2 November 1943.

History

United States
- Name: Increase A. Lapham
- Namesake: Increase A. Lapham
- Owner: War Shipping Administration (WSA)
- Operator: Alaska Packers Association (APA)
- Ordered: as a Type EC2-S-C1 hull, MCE hull 1584
- Builder: Permanente Metals Corporation, Richmond, California
- Yard number: 1584
- Way number: 2
- Laid down: 10 June 1943
- Launched: 29 June 1943
- Sponsored by: Mrs. Chester P. Kenman
- In service: 16 July 1943
- Fate: transferred to the US Navy, 5 October 1943

United States
- Name: Alkes
- Namesake: The star Alkes
- Acquired: 5 October 1943
- Commissioned: 29 October 1943
- Decommissioned: 20 February 1946
- Stricken: 12 March 1946
- Identification: Hull symbol: AK-110; Code letters: NKTA
- Honors and awards: 3 × battle stars
- Fate: Laid up in National Defense Reserve Fleet, James River Group, Lee Hall, Virginia, 27 February 1946; Sold for scrapping, 26 October 1971, delivered, 26 January 1972

General characteristics
- Class & type: Crater-class cargo ship
- Displacement: 4,023 long tons (4,088 t) (standard); 14,550 long tons (14,780 t) (full load)
- Length: 441 ft 6 in (134.57 m)
- Beam: 56 ft 11 in (17.35 m)
- Draft: 28 ft 4 in (8.64 m)
- Installed power: 2 × Babcock & Wilcox header-type boilers, 220psi 450°; 2,500 shp (1,900 kW)
- Propulsion: 1 × Joshua Hendy vertical triple-expansion reciprocating steam engine; 1 × shaft
- Speed: 12.5 kn (23.2 km/h; 14.4 mph)
- Capacity: 7,800 t (7,700 long tons) DWT; 444,206 cu ft (12,578.5 m^{3}) (non-refrigerated)
- Complement: 206
- Armament: 1 × 5 in (127 mm)/38 caliber dual-purpose (DP) gun; 1 × 3 in (76 mm)/50 caliber DP gun; 2 × 40 mm (1.57 in) Bofors anti-aircraft (AA) gun mounts; 6 × 20 mm (0.79 in) Oerlikon cannon AA gun mounts

USS Alkes (AK-110) was a Crater-class cargo ship commissioned by the US Navy for service in World War II, named after Alkes, a star in the Crater constellation. She was responsible for delivering troops, goods and equipment to locations in the war zone.

== Service history ==
Increase A. Lapham was a Liberty ship laid down under a Maritime Commission (MARCOM) contract, MC hull 1584, on 10 June 1943, at Richmond, California, by the Permanente Metals Corporation, Yard No. 2; launched on 29 June 1943; sponsored by Mrs. Chester P. Kenman; acquired by the Navy on 5 October 1943; converted for naval service by the Hurley Marine Works, Oakland, California; renamed Alkes (AK-110) on 6 October 1943; and placed in commission at Oakland on 29 October 1943.

After shakedown training, the new cargo ship got underway for Pearl Harbor, Hawaii, her base of operations while she carried supplies to the forward areas in the Pacific Ocean. In early December, the ship sailed to the Gilbert Islands with Task Unit (TU) 16.15.1. She reached Makin Island on 16 December, and commenced unloading. The ship moved to Baker Island on 31 December, to take on cargo prior to returning to Pearl Harbor, where she arrived on 13 January 1944. Shortly after returning to Hawaii, the vessel began taking on supplies and equipment for another shuttle run. Alkes sailed on 25 January for the Marshall Islands. Upon reaching Majuro Atoll, on 3 February, the ship began unloading her cargo to support ongoing landing operations. One week later, she reversed her course and arrived back at Pearl Harbor on 21 February.

Alkes got underway again on 12 March, bound for the Marshall and Gilbert Islands with Task Group 16.12. Among her ports of call were Eniwetok, Kwajalein, and Majuro, Marshall Islands; and Tarawa and Makin, Gilbert Islands. Alkes returned to Pearl Harbor on 8 May, to replenish her cargo. She shaped a course back to the Marshalls on 22 May and made stops at Kwajalein and Eniwetok. The vessel arrived at Guam on 8 August, where she remained for one month discharging cargo and delivering fresh water to various ships of the fleet. Alkes arrived back at Pearl Harbor on 11 September. After 10 days in port, she continued sailing east toward the United States. The vessel reached San Pedro, California, on 3 October and, shortly thereafter, began alterations and repairs. She moved to San Francisco, California, on 27 October, to take on cargo and, on 6 November, sailed for Pearl Harbor.

The ship reached Hawaiian waters on 16 November, and sailed the next day for Eniwetok, Guam, and Ulithi. Alkes reached Ulithi on 13 December, and assumed duty there as a fleet issue ship. She operated at Ulithi until 6 February 1945, when she got underway for a return voyage to California. Alkes arrived at San Pedro on 4 March and underwent repairs while taking on supplies and equipment. She sailed on the 23d to resume her cargo operations in the Western Pacific. On 12 April, the ship returned to Ulithi, where she remained until late May, preparing for the impending assault on the Ryūkyūs. Alkes got underway with TU 13.11.2 on 23 May, bound for Okinawa. She remained off that island and Kerama Retto from 28 May through 13 August issuing her cargo to units of the invasion force. She experienced numerous air attacks but continued to carry out her duties without sustaining any serious damage.

She left Okinawa in mid-August and sailed via Ulithi to the west coast of the United States. The ship again reached San Pedro on 14 September and remained there until early January 1946, serving as a fleet issue ship. On 3 January, she set a course for the US East Coast. Having transited the Panama Canal, Alkes arrived at Norfolk, Virginia, on 31 January. Preparations for her inactivation were then begun. The vessel sailed to Baltimore, Maryland, on 8 February and was placed out of commission there on 20 February 1946. She was returned to the Maritime Administration on 27 February, and her name was struck from the Navy List on 12 March 1946. The ship was subsequently laid up in the National Defense Reserve Fleet, James River Group, Lee Hall, Virginia, as SS Increase A. Lapham. She was sold on 26 October 1971, to Hierros Ardes S. A., Bilbao, Spain, for scrapping.

== Awards ==
Alkes won three battle stars for her World War II service. Her crew was eligible for the following medals:

- American Campaign Medal
- Asiatic-Pacific Campaign Medal (3)
- World War II Victory Medal

== Bibliography ==
- "Alkes (AK-110)". Dictionary of American Naval Fighting Ships. Naval History and Heritage Command. 11 December 2016.
- "Kaiser Permanente No. 2, Richmond CA". ShipbuildingHistory.com. 13 October 2010.
- "USS Alkes (AK-110)". NavSource. 8 November 2013.
- "INCREASE A. LAPHAM". United States Department of Transportation. Archived from the original on 2 November 2016.
