= Phi3 Hydrae =

Binary star system in the constellation Hydra

Phi^{3} Hydrae
- Location of φ^{3} Hydrae (circled in red)

Observation data Epoch J2000.0 Equinox J2000.0 (ICRS)
- Constellation: Hydra
- Right ascension: 10^{h} 38^{m} 34.95281^{s}
- Declination: −16° 52′ 35.6665″
- Apparent magnitude (V): 4.90

Characteristics
- Evolutionary stage: red clump
- Spectral type: G8 III
- B−V color index: 0.912

Astrometry
Radial velocity (R_{v})	+17.45±0.70 km/s
Proper motion (μ)	RA: −98.92 mas/yr Dec.: +25.84 mas/yr
Parallax (π)	15.49±0.57 mas
Distance	211 ± 8 ly (65 ± 2 pc)
Absolute magnitude (M_{V})	+0.89

Orbit
Period (P)	1200 d
Eccentricity (e)	0.1
Periastron epoch (T)	2420760 JD
Argument of periastron (ω) (secondary)	270°
Semi-amplitude (K_{1}) (primary)	4.0 km/s

Details

φ^{3} Hya
Mass	2.04 M_{☉}
Radius	9 R_{☉}
Luminosity	48 L_{☉}
Surface gravity (log g)	2.95 cgs
Temperature	4,952±17 K
Metallicity [Fe/H]	−0.22±0.12 dex
Rotational velocity (v sin i)	3.6 km/s
Age	1.17 Gyr

Other designations
- φ^{3} Hya, BD−16°3100, FK5 2850, HD 92214, HIP 52085, HR 4171, SAO 156122

Database references
SIMBAD	data

Phi^{3} Hydrae (φ^{3} Hya) is a binary star in the equatorial constellation of Hydra. It originally received the Flamsteed designation of 2 Crateris before being placed in Hydra. Based upon an annual parallax shift of 15.49 mas as seen from Earth, it is located around 211 light years from the Sun. It is visible to the naked eye with an apparent visual magnitude of 4.90. It forms a triangle with the fainter φ^{1} Hydrae and φ^{2} Hydrae, between μ Hydrae and ν Hydrae.

This is a single-lined spectroscopic binary star system with an orbital period of about 1,200 days and an eccentricity of 0.1. The primary, component A, is an evolved G-type giant star with a stellar classification of G8 III. It is a red clump star, which means it is generating energy through the fusion of helium at its core. The star has twice the mass of the Sun and has expanded to 9 times the Sun's radius. It is 1.17 billion years old and is radiating 48 times the solar luminosity from its photosphere at an effective temperature of 4,952 K.
