= Hurley Marine Shipyard =

Shipyard in Oakland, California, United States

Coordinates: 37.7895°N 122.264°W

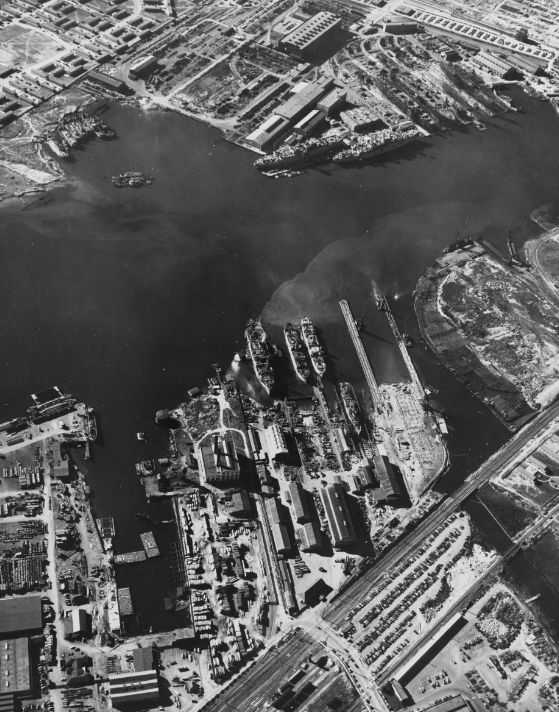
Hurley Marine Shipyard in 1944, the Alameda Works Shipyard in the background

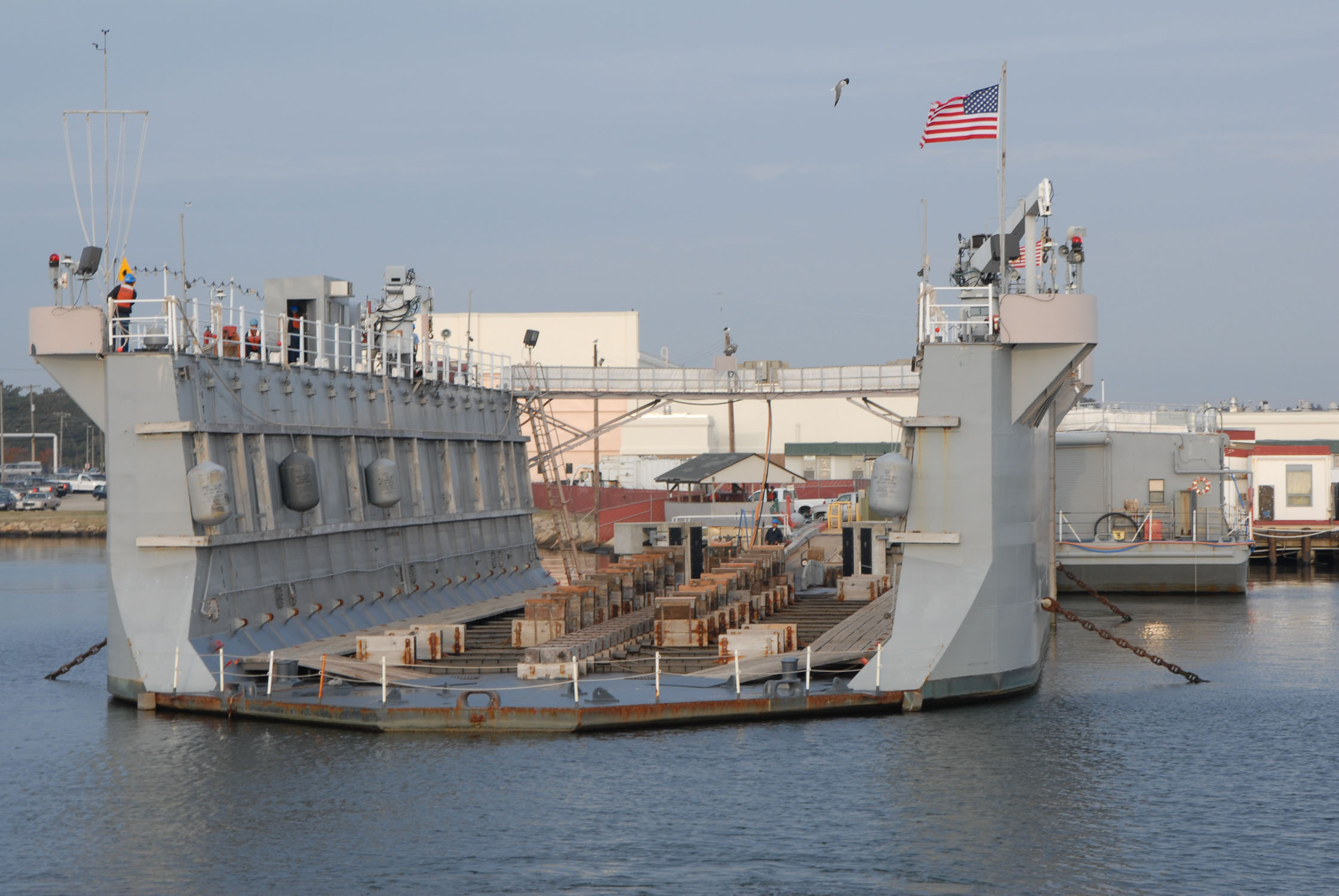
Auxiliary Floating Drydock, Light (AFDL), like the one used at Naval Industrial Reserve Repair Facility, Oakland

Hurley Marine Shipyard of Hurley Marine Works also site of Naval Reserve Armory, Oakland and the Naval Industrial Reserve Repair Facility, Oakland was a shipyard in Oakland, California. The Hurley Marine Shipyard opened in 1940 on property (the former Hanlon Dry Dock and Shipbuilding yard) that previously had belonged to the General Engineering & Drydock Company, in 1951 the yard was operated by Crowley Maritime Corporation. In 1964 the site was operated by Pacific Dry Dock and Repair Company. The shipyard closed in 1992, today most of the shipyard is vacant land with part of the land now Leal Sea Boat Works owned by Leal Charonnat, of Leal Charonnat - Architect & Engineering. A small boatyard operated at the site from 1935 to 1940. The shipyard was located at 321 Embarcadero Oakland on the San Francisco Bay, Inner Oakland Harbor. Crowley Maritime Corporation was the parent corporation of Pacific Dry Dock, which used the shipyard to repair its fleet of tugboats and other ships. Pacific Dry Dock also operated a shipyard across from Coast Guard Island till 1991 at 1414 Embarcadero Oakland.

In 1943 US Navy opened the Naval Industrial Reserve Repair and Naval Reserve Armory, Oakland on 2.8 acres of the site to support World War II. On June 12, 1944 the Navy moved a 2,800 ton Auxiliary Floating Drydock, Light (AFDL) to the site to repaired Navy ships. After the war on April 16, 1948 Navy ended the lease of the Naval Reserve Armory. On June 30, 1965 Navy ended the lease of the Naval Industrial Reserve Repair Facility. The site returned to the Port of Oakland. From 1955 to 1965 the Martinolich Shipbuilding Company leased the Auxiliary Floating Drydock.

US Navy ARDC-9, later called, AFDL-42, an Auxiliary Repair Dock, Concrete (ARDC), was sold to Hurley Marine Works in 1945 and scrapped in 1975. AFDL-42 was built by J. E. Haddock Company in San Pedro, California it was 8,300 tons and had a length of 389 feet.

== Repair work ==
Some ships overalled at the shipyard:

- USS Audrain
- USS Lynx (AK-100)
- USS Alkes
- Wapama (steam schooner)
- USS Potomac (AG-25)
- Sea Giant Tugboat, 1,000 tons

== See also ==
- California during World War II
- Maritime history of California
- Madden and Lewis Company
