= USS Audrain =

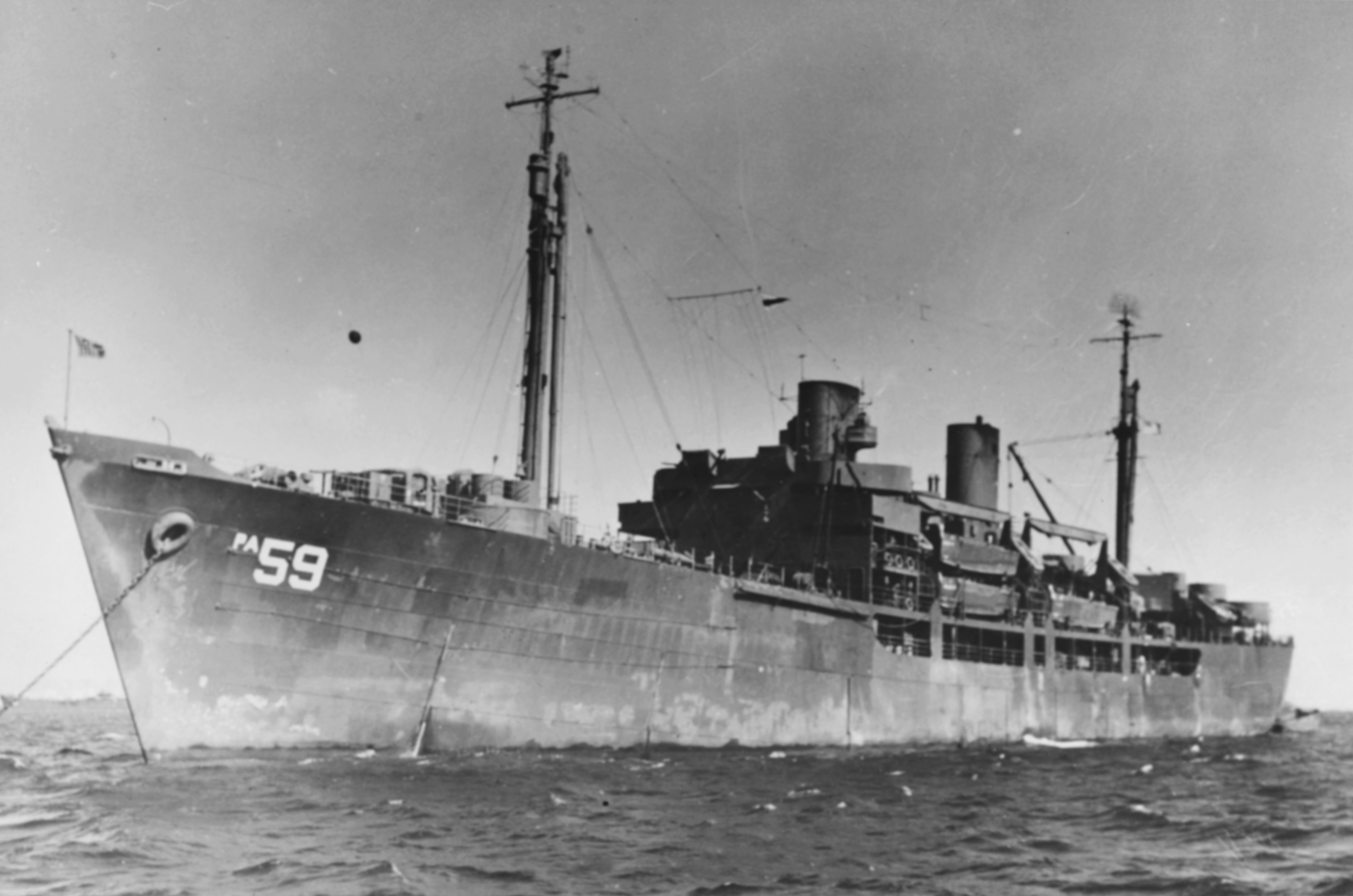
- USS Audrain (APA-59) at anchor, date and place unknown

History

United States
- Name: USS Audrain (APA-59)
- Namesake: Audrain County, Missouri
- Builder: Consolidated Steel
- Laid down: 1 December 1943
- Launched: 21 April 1944
- Acquired: 1 September 1944
- Commissioned: 2 September 1944
- Decommissioned: 15 May 1946
- Stricken: 1 August 1947
- Honours and awards: One battle star for World War II service
- Fate: Sold for scrapping, 11 July 1972

General characteristics
- Class & type: Gilliam-class attack transport
- Displacement: 4,247 tons (lt), 7,080 t.(fl)
- Length: 426 ft (130 m)
- Beam: 58 ft (18 m)
- Draft: 16 ft (4.9 m)
- Propulsion: Westinghouse turboelectric drive, 2 boilers, 2 propellers, Design shaft horsepower 6,000
- Speed: 16.9 knots
- Capacity: 47 officers, 802 enlisted; cargo 85,000 cu ft, 2,600 tons
- Complement: 27 officers, 295 enlisted
- Armament: 1 x 5"/38 caliber dual-purpose gun mount, 4 x twin 40 mm gun mounts, 10 x single 20 mm gun mounts
- Notes: MCV Hull No. 1852, hull type S4-SE2-BD1

USS Audrain (APA-59) was a Gilliam-class attack transport that served with the US Navy during World War II.

Laid down 1 December 1943, Audrain was launched on 21 April 1944, acquired by the Navy 1 September 1944 and commissioned the next day.

== Operational history ==
Audrain was laid down on 1 December 1943 under a Maritime Commission contract (MC hull 1852) at Wilmington, California, by the Consolidated Steel Corp.; launched on 21 April 1944; sponsored by Mrs. Arthur G. Rydstrom; acquired by the Navy on 1 September 1944; and placed in commission at San Pedro, California, on 2 September 1944.

The newly commissioned transport held shakedown training off the southern California coast. In late October, she sailed to San Francisco and took on passengers and cargo. On 21 October, Audrain got underway for Manus, Admiralty Islands. While en route, the ship developed leaks in the tubes of one boiler and, upon her arrival at Manus on 9 November, made repairs. The transport then proceeded to Nouméa, New Caledonia, to embark Army troops for training exercises in preparation for landings on Luzon, Philippine Islands. During December, she held exercises off Nouméa as well as at Guadalcanal and Tulagi, Solomon Islands.

Audrain participated in two combat operations, the landings at Lingayen Gulf (9 January 1944) and the massive invasion of Okinawa (1 to 9 April 1945).

Audrain got underway on 2 January 1945 with task Group (TG) 77.9 with troops embarked for the assault on Luzon. She anchored in the transport area in Lingayen Gulf on the morning of 9 January and landed her troops without opposition. The unloading was completed by the evening of 12 January, and the transport retired with her task unit to Leyte, Philippine Islands. On 18 January, Audrain set course for Biak, Schouten Islands. There, she took on troops and equipment for transportation to Mindoro, Philippine Islands. She discharged these passengers and their gear on secured beaches in the San Jose area of Mindoro on 9 February and retired to Leyte Gulf.

During the next several weeks, Audrain was involved in training exercises in Philippine waters. On 27 March, the vessel got underway with TG 55.1 for the invasion of Okinawa. She arrived off that island on D day, 1 April, began lowering her boats, and sent them to other transports to assist in landing their assault troops. On the morning of 3 April, Audrain began landing troops and cargo in the Hagushi area.

She experienced several air attacks while in the area. On 6 June, Audrain opened fire on a lone Japanese Aichi D3A "Val" bomber, but scored no hits. However, two 40-millimeter projectiles fired by neighboring vessels hit her on the forward bulkhead of the navigation bridge, slightly wounding three members of her crew. The landings were completed on 9 April, and the vessel left the Okinawa area bound for Hawaii. The ship paused at Guam on 14 April to transfer casualties from Okinawa to hospitals ashore, and then she continued on to Pearl Harbor.

Audrain arrived there on 1 May and underwent a 10-day period of repairs. She then sailed on to San Francisco, arriving there on 18 May. The ship entered the yards of Hurley Marine Works, Oakland, California, for repairs and alterations. After leaving the yard, the ship took on passengers and cargo for transportation to forward areas. She got underway for Pearl Harbor on 31 May. Following a brief layover in that port, Audrain set sail for Leyte. She made stops en route at Eniwetok and Ulithi before arriving at Leyte on 30 June.

The ship discharged her cargo ashore and embarked Navy passengers bound for the United States. She returned to the West Coast via Pearl Harbor and reached San Francisco on 29 July. After discharging her passengers, the transport returned to Hurley Marine Works to undergo repairs and alterations. While she was in the yard, the Japanese capitulated on 15 August. The ship returned to duty on 18 August and got underway for Guam. She paused en route at Eniwetok before arriving at Guam on 2 September.

Audrain proceeded to Saipan and dropped anchor there on 10 September. She loaded cargo and troops of the 2nd Marine Division earmarked for occupation duty in Japan.

The transport sailed for Japan on 18 September. She arrived at Nagasaki five days later and landed her forces without incident. On 26 September, Audrain left Japan, via Manila, and sailed to Subic Bay, Philippines. She embarked more troops there and returned to Japan. She put these passengers ashore for the occupation of Wakayama. On 1 November, the ship arrived back at Manila. She took on military passengers for return to the United States. Audrain arrived at Portland, Oregon, on 27 November. She then entered a shipyard there for repairs.

The vessel commenced another voyage to Japan on 26 December. She arrived at Yokohama on 14 January 1946 and debarked troops and supplies. She left Japanese waters on 27 January and set a course for San Pedro via Pearl Harbor. Audrain left California, sailed back to Hawaii in early April, and remained in port at Pearl Harbor for the duration of her naval career.

Audrain was decommissioned at Pearl Harbor on 15 May 1946, and transferred to the Maritime Commission 25 July 1947, for laying up in the National Defense Reserve Fleet at Suisun Bay, California.

Her name was struck from the Navy list on 1 August 1947, and the ship was sold for scrap 11 July 1972 to the National Metal & Steel Corporation of Terminal Island, California.

=== Decorations ===
Audrain earned one battle star for her World War II service.
