= Charles E. Moore =

American industrialist (1894–1953)

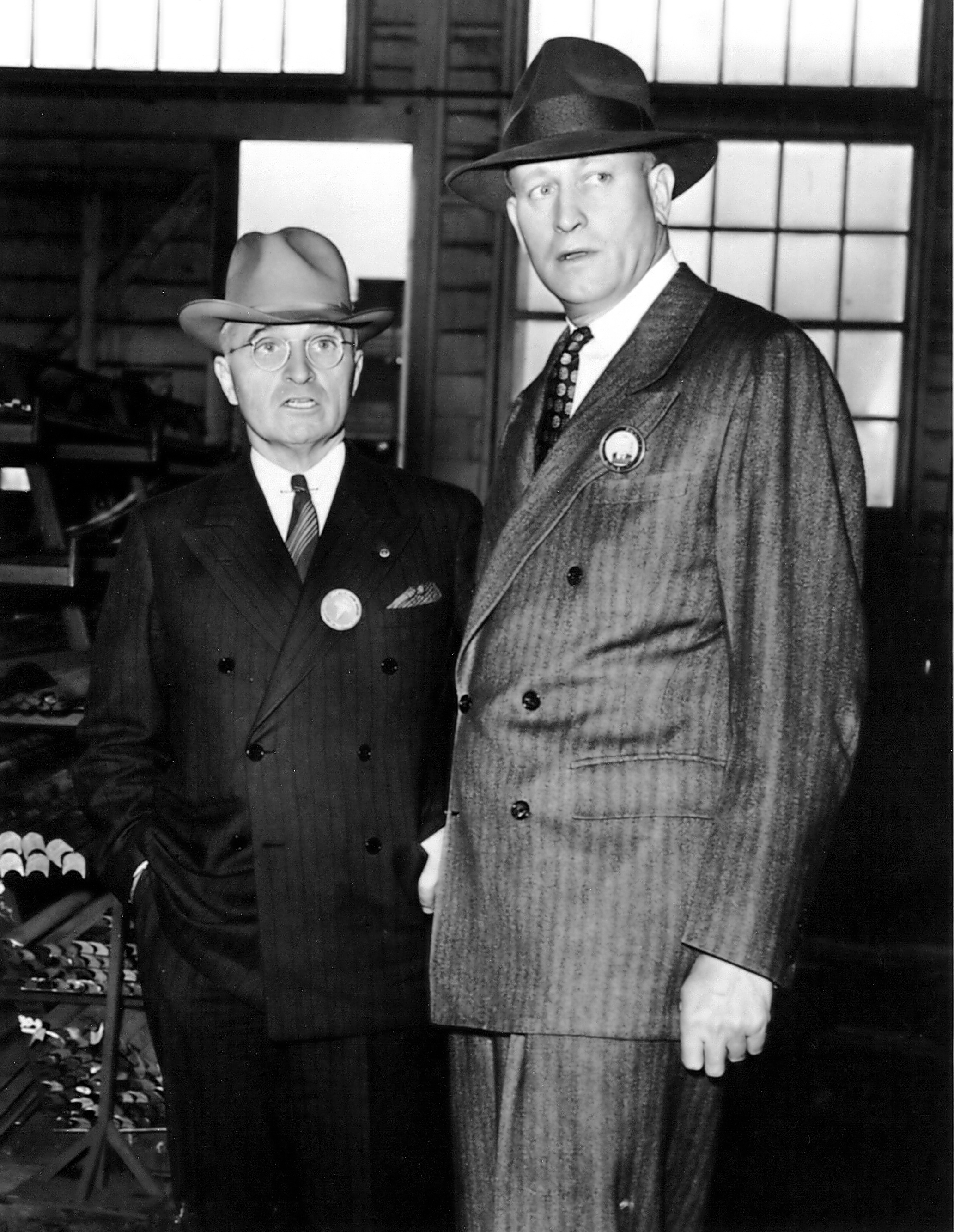
- Charles Moore (right) with US Senator Harry S. Truman at the Joshua Hendy Iron Works (1942)
- Born: April 21, 1894; San Bernardino, California, U.S.
- Died: June 19, 1953 (aged 59); San Mateo, California, U.S.
- Resting place: Oak Hill Memorial Cemetery; San Jose, California, U.S.
- Occupation: Industrialist
- Known for: Manufacture of Liberty ship engines during World War II

Charles Edward Moore (April 21, 1894 – June 19, 1953) was an American industrialist who is best known for his contribution to the maritime shipbuilding industry during World War II.

== Early life and career ==
Charles E. Moore II was born in San Bernardino, California, to Charles Edward Moore, a Canadian immigrant, and E.A.M. Kinkaid. His father established the jewelry firm of Moore & Lewis.

After completing the eighth grade, Moore entered the workforce, working as a machinist at the Santa Fe Railroad. At age 18, he became a "boomer", the machinist's name for a drifter. He traveled all over the U.S. and Mexico until the age of 21, at which time he set his sights on working at a certain machine tool company. As legend has it, Moore's ambitions were thwarted by the owner who told him that he didn't have the education to succeed. "I was horribly insulted" he later said, "but then I calmed down and realized that he was right." So he enrolled in high school as a 6-foot-6-inch, 285-lb freshman and finished four years' work in one.

Moore entered the U.S. military (1917-1918), serving as a lieutenant in the Coastal Artillery.

After leaving the military, Moore again applied to work at the machine tool company. He was hired and quickly moved into more responsible positions. In 1927 he bought the company, renaming it: The Moore Machinery Company.

== World War II ==
Moore ascribed to "a fundamental policy of never selling a machine that we wouldn't take back if the customer didn't like it". It was this policy that eventually led to Moore's purchase of the Joshua Hendy Iron Works in Sunnyvale, California. He visited the plant in response to a complaint from the owner. Seeing the plant's vast largely-untapped potential, he and his partners (the Six Companies) purchased Hendy for $500,000 in November 1940. In seven years (1940 to 1947) through World War II, largely under Moore's leadership (Moore left the company in March 1946) Hendy grew from 60 employees to over 11,000. During the war, the Hendy work force, "The Iron Men and Women of Hendy", produced an astounding 754 Triple Expansion EC-2 Engines (used to power Liberty ships) at the rate of one every 40.8 hours. The engines weighed 137 tons (274,000 pounds) and were 24 feet (7.3 m) tall. Moore became known as "America's No. 1 'Can Do' Man".

In mid-1942, Moore and his partners also bought the Crocker-Wheeler Electrical Mfg. Co. in New Jersey, for $3,200,000. After the war, Moore sold his interest in Hendy to his partners, and spent much of his time traveling as a technical advisor on heavy machinery for the government. In 1941 he had traveled to the United Kingdom for the US office of Production Management, Harriman Commission, to advise tool manufacturing plants there. Following the war he was an industry consultant in Greece for the State Department. He went to Italy in 1947–49 as a Marshall Plan consultant.

== Boy Scouts of America ==
Moore became involved in the Boy Scouts of America (Santa Clara Council), as VP and chairman of the Boy Scout Memorial Foundation Board. In 1954 a building in Santa Clara was dedicated as "The Charles E. Moore Memorial Boy Scout Building" at the corner of Park & Newhall.

== Death ==
Moore died unexpectedly on June 19, 1953, of a massive heart attack while horseback riding in San Mateo. He is buried in San Jose's Oak Hill Memorial Cemetery.
