= Pacific Dry Dock and Repair Company =

Shipyard in Oakland, California, United States

Pacific Dry Dock and Repair Company was owned by its parent corporation, Crowley Maritime Corporation. Pacific Dry Dock and Repair Company operated two shipyards in Oakland, California. Crowley Maritime used the shipyards to repair its fleet of tugboats and other ships.

- Pacific Dry Dock and Repair Company site 1, this was located at 1414 Embarcadero Oakland, across from Coast Guard Island till 1991.37.783713°N 122.244364°W

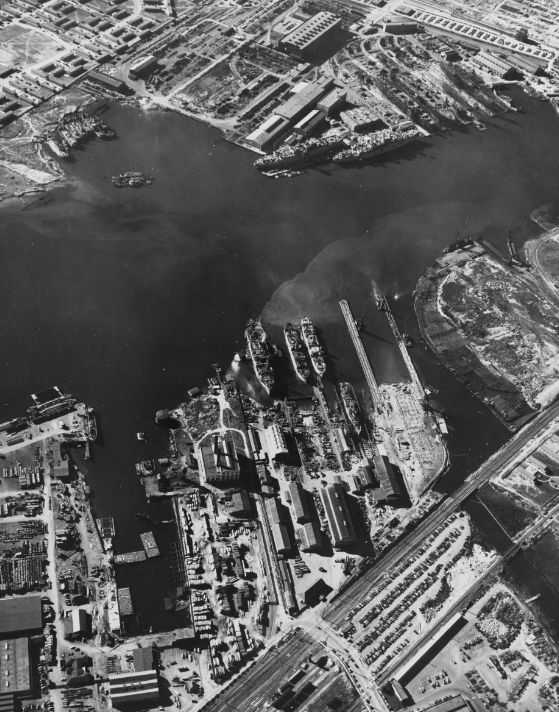
Pacific Dry Dock and Repair Company Yard 11

- In 1951 the Hurley Marine Shipyard operation was taken over by Crowley Maritime Corporation and later in 1964 was renamed Pacific Dry Dock and Repair Company Yard 11. The shipyard closed in 1992, today most of the shipyard is vacant land with part of the land now Leal Seal Boat Works owned by Leal Charonnat, of Leal Charonnat - Architect & Engineering. A small boatyard operated at the site from 1935 to 1940. The shipyard was located at 321 Embarcadero Oakland on the San Francisco Bay, Inner Oakland Harbor. 37.7895°N 122.264°W

== See also ==
- North Van Ship Repair also called Pacific Dry Dock in Vancouver, British Columbia, Canada
- California during World War II
- Maritime history of California
- Madden and Lewis Company
