= USS Albireo =

Cargo ship of the United States Navy

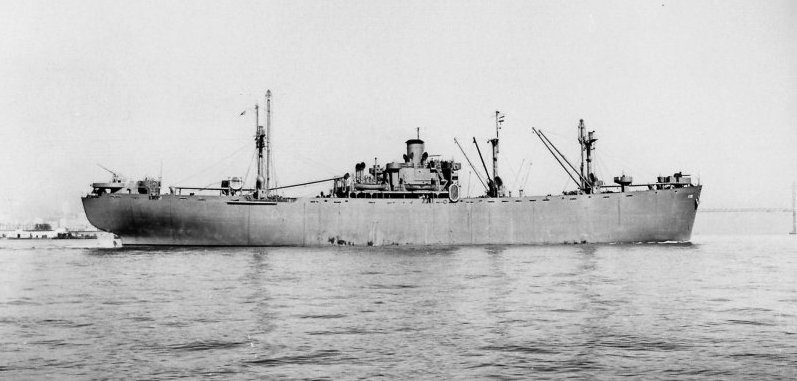
- Broadside view of USS Albireo (AK-90) off San Francisco, 30 March 1943.

History

United States
- Name: John G. Nicolay; Albireo
- Namesake: John G. Nicolay; The star Albireo
- Ordered: as a Type EC2-S-C1 hull, MCE hull 525
- Builder: Permanente Metals Corporation, Richmond, California
- Cost: $1,146,263
- Yard number: 525
- Way number: 2
- Laid down: 17 January 1943
- Launched: 25 February 1943
- Sponsored by: Mrs. Donald W. Day
- Acquired: 9 March 1943
- Commissioned: 29 March 1943
- Decommissioned: 5 July 1946
- Stricken: 31 July 1946
- Identification: Hull symbol: AK-90; Code letters: NKGD
- Fate: Sold for commercial use, 22 August 1947

Union of South Africa
- Name: President Steyn
- Namesake: Martinus Theunis Steyn
- Owner: Southern Steamship Proprietary, Ltd., Johannesburg
- Acquired: 22 August 1947
- Fate: Sold 1949

Union of South Africa
- Name: President Steyn
- Owner: Northern Steamship Proprietary, Ltd., Johannesburg
- Acquired: 1949
- Fate: Sold 1951

Liberia
- Name: Hidalgo
- Owner: Cia Nav Hidalgo, SA, Panama RP
- Acquired: 1951
- Fate: Sold 1954

Liberia
- Name: Ocean Sailor
- Owner: Blue Bay Steamship Corporation
- Acquired: 1954
- Fate: Sold for scrap, 1967

General characteristics
- Class & type: Crater-class cargo ship
- Displacement: 4,023 long tons (4,088 t) (standard); 14,550 long tons (14,780 t) (full load)
- Length: 441 ft 6 in (134.57 m)
- Beam: 56 ft 11 in (17.35 m)
- Draft: 28 ft 4 in (8.64 m)
- Installed power: 2 × Oil fired 450 °F (232 °C) boilers, operating at 220 psi (1,500 kPa) , (manufactured by Babcock & Wilcox); 2,500 shp (1,900 kW)
- Propulsion: 1 × Vertical triple-expansion reciprocating steam engine, (manufactured by Joshua Hendy); 1 × screw propeller
- Speed: 12.5 kn (23.2 km/h; 14.4 mph)
- Capacity: 7,800 t (7,700 long tons) DWT; 444,206 cu ft (12,578.5 m^{3}) (non-refrigerated)
- Complement: 206
- Armament: 1 × 5 in (127 mm)/38 caliber dual-purpose (DP) gun; 1 × 3 in (76 mm)/50 caliber DP gun; 2 × 40 mm (1.57 in) Bofors anti-aircraft (AA) gun mounts; 6 × 20 mm (0.79 in) Oerlikon cannon AA gun mounts

The USS Albireo (AK-90) was a Crater-class cargo ship in the service of the US Navy in World War II and crewed by the US Coast Guard. She was the only ship of the Navy to have borne this name. She is named after Albireo, a star in the constellation of Cygnus.

== Construction ==
Albireo was laid down 17 January 1943, as liberty ship SS John G. Nicolay, MCE hull 525, by Permanente Metals Corporation, Yard No. 1, Richmond, California, under a Maritime Commission (MARCOM) contract; launched on 25 February 1943; sponsored by Mrs. Donald W. Day; acquired by the Navy under a bareboat charter on 9 March 1943; converted for naval service by the Matson Navigation Co.; renamed Albireo on 17 March 1943 and simultaneously designated AK-90; and commissioned at San Francisco, California, on 29 March 1943.

== Service history ==
Assigned to the Naval Transport Service, the cargo ship conducted shakedown training in San Francisco Bay before getting underway on 9 April 1943, for a cargo run to Pearl Harbor, Hawaii. The ship arrived back at San Francisco on 5 May and operated along the west coast through late August, towing barges and delivering cargo to Seattle, Washington; Eureka and San Francisco, California; and Astoria, Oregon. Albireo departed San Francisco on 26 August in a convoy bound for Espiritu Santo, New Hebrides, and Wellington, New Zealand; arrived back at San Francisco on 20 November; discharged her cargo at Oakland, California; and entered the United Engineering Co. shipyard for repairs.

The ship got underway for Espiritu Santo on 27 December. She arrived there on 1 February 1944 and unloaded her cargo and passengers. On 22 February, she shifted to Guadalcanal to discharge more cargo. Albireo touched at Espiritu Santo once again on 20 March; then sailed three days later for the west coast. The ship reached San Francisco on 19 April. After taking on another load of supplies and equipment, the cargo vessel set sail on 2 May for Seeadler Harbor, Manus Island. She arrived there on 22 June and remained in port for approximately six weeks while discharging cargo ashore.

Albireo weighed anchor on 1 August and touched at Milne Bay, New Guinea, three days later. She debarked elements of a Navy construction battalion and their equipment before getting underway again on 26 August. The vessel reached San Francisco on 21 September and entered a brief period of upkeep. She made a voyage to Pearl Harbor in October, returned to San Francisco on 1 November, and underwent voyage repairs and alterations at the United Engineering Co. The ship resumed operations on 26 November, and she joined a convoy bound for Espiritu Santo. She paused en route at Pearl Harbor for minor repairs and to take on personnel and arrived at Espiritu Santo on 25 December.

The vessel remained in port there through the Christmas holidays. On 3 January 1945, the ship reversed her course back to the west coast. She arrived in San Francisco Bay on 6 February and began a period of voyage repairs and alterations. The cargo vessel made another voyage to Manus during late February, March, and April. After a three-day in-port period at Pearl Harbor, the ship arrived back at San Francisco on 19 May.

After a leave and upkeep period, Albireo set sail on 13 June for the Philippines. She arrived in San Pedro Bay on 14 July. In early August, she began her voyage to San Francisco and, while sailing to the west coast, received word of the Japanese capitulation ending World War II.

On the first day of September, the vessel moored in San Francisco Bay and entered upkeep. Later that month, she sailed to San Pedro, California, to take on cargo. The ship got underway on 5 October and reached Eniwetok on the 23d. She continued on to Samar and Manila, Philippines. Albireo left the latter port on 26 November and sailed to Yokosuka, Japan. Upon her arrival there on 3 December, the ship began providing supplies and equipment to American occupation forces ashore. She remained in Japanese waters until late March 1946.

Albireo left Japan and shaped a course for the United States. She paused at Eniwetok in late March through early April; then pressed on to the Panama Canal Zone. The cargo ship transited the canal on 29 May and headed on toward the east coast.

=== Decommissioning ===
Albireo arrived at Norfolk, Virginia, on 18 June, and was decommissioned there on 5 July 1946. She was turned over to the War Shipping Administration (WSA) for disposal on 18 July 1946, and her name was struck from the Navy list on 31 July 1946. She entered the National Defense Reserve Fleet, James River Group, Lee Hall, Virginia, on 17 July 1946.

== Merchant service ==
Albireo was sold to Southern Steamships Proprietary, Ltd., of Johannesburg, 22 August 1947, renamed SS President Steyn, and re-flagged as a Union of South African ship. In 1949 she was sold to Northern Steamships Proprietary, Ltd., of Johannesburg.

In 1951 the ship was sold to Cia Nav Hidalgo SA, Panama RP, renamed SS Hidalgo and re-flagged in Liberia. She was sold again in 1954, to Blue Bay Steamship Corporation, and renamed SS Ocean Sailor.

The ship was finally sold to Japanese breakers, and scrapped following her arrival at Kure, Japan on 10 April 1967.

== Bibliography ==
- "Albireo". Dictionary of American Naval Fighting Ships. Naval History and Heritage Command. 16 June 2015. This article incorporates text from this source, which is in the public domain.
- "Kaiser Permanente No. 1, Richmond CA". www.ShipbuildingHistory.com. 13 October 2010.
- "USS Albireo (AK-90)". NavSource. 20 November 2015.
- "JOHN G. NICOLAY". United States Department of Transportation. Archived from the original on 12 December 2019.
- "SS JOHN G. NICOLAY".
