= Joshua Hendy Iron Works =

American engineering company

Coordinates: 37.376923°N 122.024087°W

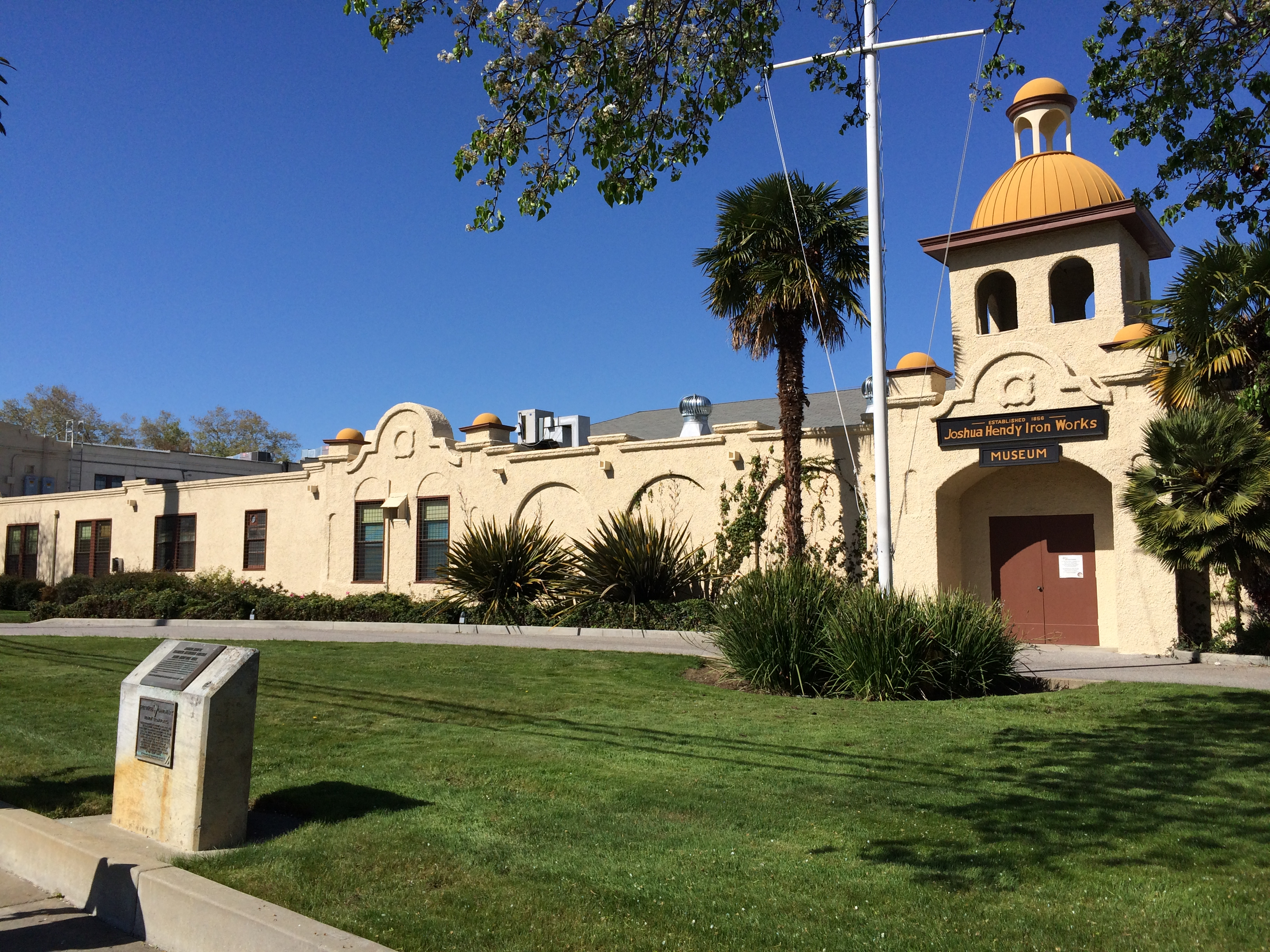
- Industry: Engineering & Manufacturing
- Founded: 1856
- Founder: Joshua Hendy
- Defunct: 1947
- Successor: Westinghouse Electronic Systems
- Headquarters: Sunnyvale, California, USA
- Products: Mining equipment, marine engines etc.
- Number of employees: 60 (1940); 11,500 (1945)

The Joshua Hendy Iron Works was an American engineering company that existed from the 1850s to the late 1940s. It was at one time a world leader in mining technology, and its equipment was used in constructing the Panama Canal, among other major projects. The company went on to serve many different markets during the course of its existence, but is perhaps best remembered today for its contribution to the American shipbuilding industry during World War II.

== Beginnings ==
The company was named after its founder Joshua Hendy. Born in Cornwall, England in 1822, Hendy at the age of 13 migrated with two brothers to South Carolina in the United States. Joshua married and became a blacksmith in Houston, Texas. After the death of his wife and two children from yellow fever, he sailed around Cape Horn to San Francisco in 1849 to participate in the California Gold Rush.

Hendy built California's first redwood lumber mill, the Benicia Sawmill (the region is now known as the Hendy Woods State Park). In 1856, he established the Joshua Hendy Iron Works in San Francisco to supply equipment to Gold Rush placer miners. The Hendy plant supplied various equipment to the mining industry.

== Mining industry leader ==
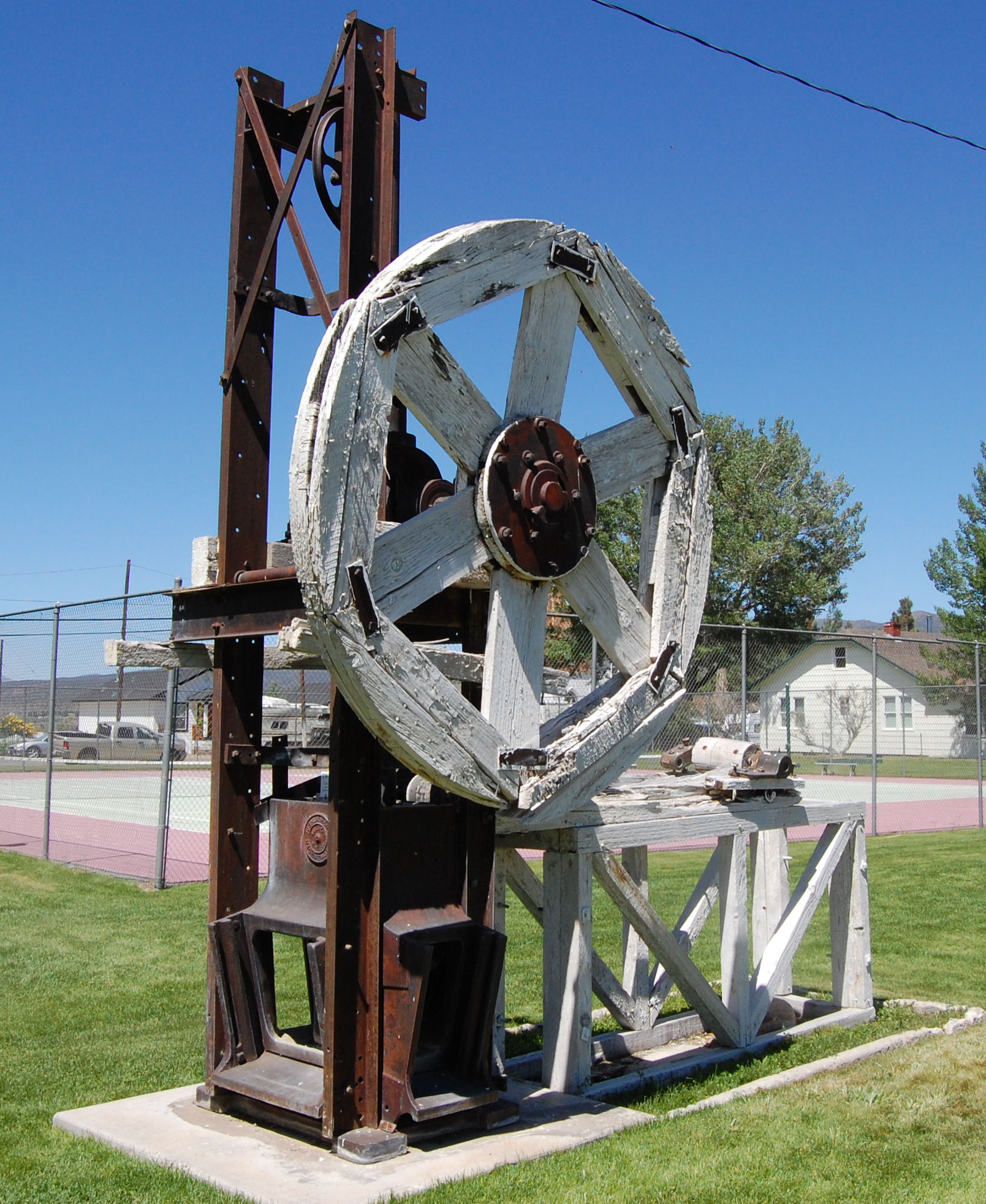
Hendy stamp mill, mid 1800s

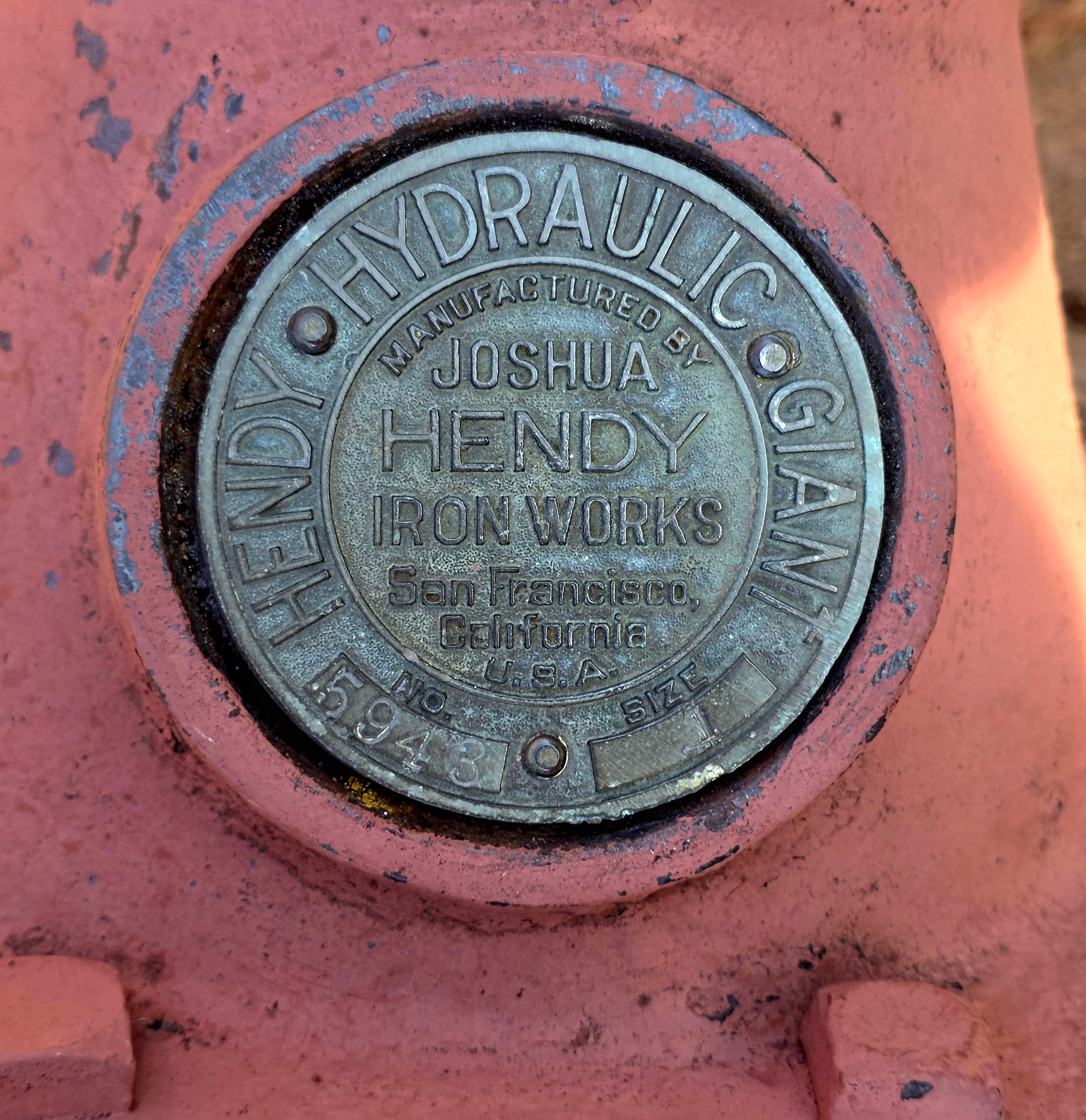
Joshua Hendy Iron Works nameplate on a hydraulic mining monitor

By the 1890s, the Joshua Hendy Iron Works was a leader in the mining industry, supplying equipment to mining companies globally, including ore carts, ore crushers, stamp and ball mills and other equipment.

Many of the engineering innovations developed by Hendy became mining industry standards, employed as late as the 1970s, such as the hydraulic giant monitor, the tangential water wheel, the Hendy ore concentrator, the Challenge ore feeder, and the Hendy hydraulic gravel elevator. Hendy giant hydraulic crushers were used to excavate the Panama Canal.

After Joshua Hendy died in 1891, management of the company was taken over by his nephews Samuel and John. After the April 18, 1906 earthquake a fire devastated the original San Francisco factory, and the company was re-established in Sunnyvale, California after the local government enticed the company with free land. Samuel died after a short illness on March 14, 1906 and was succeeded as president of the company by his brother John.

== World War I ==
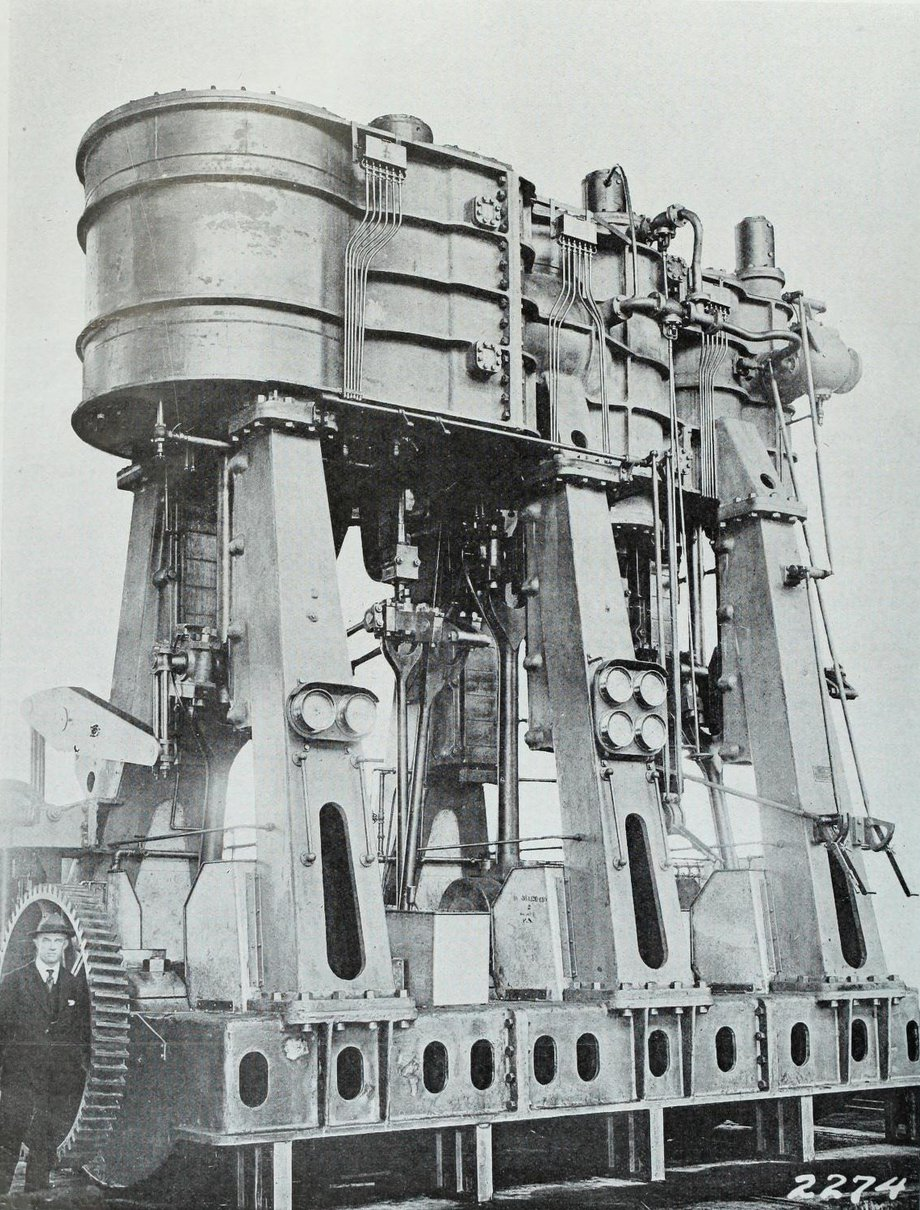
World War I Hendy marine engine

During World War I, the Hendy plant gained its first experience building marine engines by supplying 11 triple expansion steam engines for cargo ships built by Western Pipe & Steel, for the U.S. Shipping Board. Each engine weighed about 137 tons and stood 24½ feet high. Although the first marine engines built by Hendy, they proved to be reliable, with most providing many years of service. Essentially the same engine design (with minor improvements) was used by the company for its mass production of US Liberty ship engines in World War II.

== Interwar period ==
In the early 1920s, Hendy's hydraulic mining equipment was used in the regrading of Seattle, described as perhaps the largest such alteration of urban terrain in history.

With the onset of the Great Depression however, and hampered by indifferent management, the Hendy Iron Works - like many other heavy equipment manufacturers of the era - fell on hard times. The company adapted by finding new markets, for example by contracting for the building of giant gates and valves for the hydroelectric schemes of the Hoover and Grand Coulee dams. During this period it also produced equipment as diverse as crawler tractors, freight car wheel pullers, parts for internal combustion engines and standards for street lamps. Some of the ornate street lamps built by the company can still be seen in San Francisco's Chinatown district today.

== World War II ==
By the late 1930s the company was in financial difficulties and had shrunk to a shadow of its former self, employing only 60 workers. The company was in the process of being taken over by the Bank of California in 1940 when businessman Charles E. Moore, with the financial support of the Six Companies, took a controlling interest. Moore soon managed to contract with the US Navy for the building of some torpedo tube mounts, and shortly thereafter he secured a contract for the building of twelve triple expansion marine steam engines.

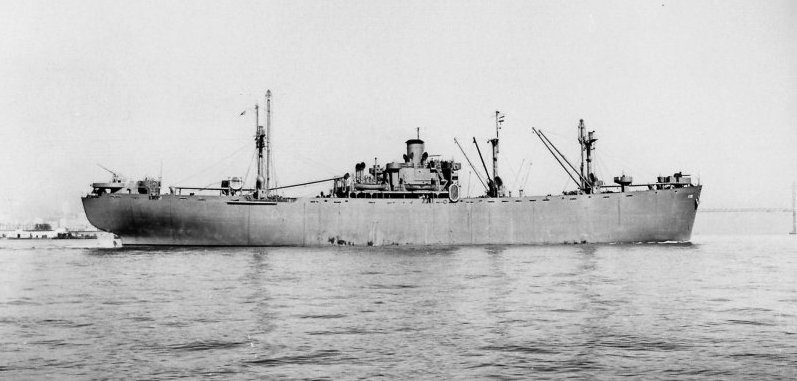
USS Albireo (AK-90), one of 754 Liberty ships powered by a Joshua Hendy triple expansion engine

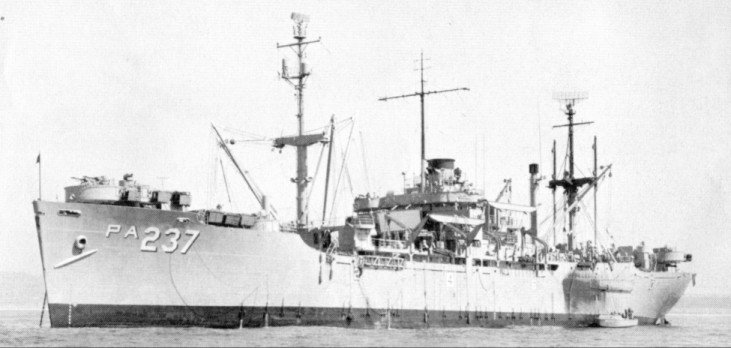
USS Bexar (APA-237), one of 53 Victory ships powered by a Joshua Hendy turbine

By 1942, with the US government's wartime Emergency Shipbuilding Program getting under way, it became clear that a large number of new marine engines would be needed to power the new ships. Since there was a shortfall in capacity to produce modern steam turbines, it was realized that most of the new Liberty ships would have to be fitted with older and slower reciprocating steam engines instead. Admiral Vickery contacted Moore to ask if he could double the original order of 12 engines, to which Moore is reported to have responded that it would be as easy to tool up for a hundred as for a dozen. The company was then contracted to build 118 triple expansion steam engines for the Liberty ships.

As the war progressed and the emergency shipbuilding program continued to expand, so the orders for new engines also grew. Moore responded by streamlining production at the Joshua Hendy plant. He introduced more advanced assembly line techniques, standardizing on more production parts and enabling less skilled workers to accomplish tasks formerly carried out by skilled machinists. By 1943, the company had reduced the time required to manufacture a marine steam engine from 4,500 hours to 1,800 hours. The number of workers employed by the company also grew dramatically, reaching a peak of 11,500 during the war.

By the end of the war, the Joshua Hendy Iron Works had supplied the engines for 754 of America's 2,751 Liberty ships, or about 28% of the total – more than that of any other plant in the country and the main engines of all Tacoma-class frigates (2 per ship) built on the West Coast, 18 by Consolidated Steel in Wilmington and 12 by Kaiser Shipyards in Richmond plus 15 more built by Great Lakes shipyards and 7 in Rhode Island. In addition, the company in the late stages of the war produced 53 steam turbines and reduction gears for the more modern Victory ships.

== Postwar developments ==
In 1947, the Joshua Hendy Iron Works was sold to the Westinghouse Corporation. In the postwar period, the plant continued to produce military equipment including missile launching and control systems for nuclear-powered submarines, and antiaircraft guns. It also produced pressure hulls for undersea vehicles, nuclear power plant equipment, 216,000 horsepower (161,000 kW) wind tunnel compressors, large diameter radio telescopes, diesel engines and electrical equipment.

In 1996, Westinghouse sold the plant to Northrop Grumman, which renamed it Northrop Grumman Marine Systems.

As a legacy, the Big Thunder Mountain Railroad attraction in Disney World features Joshua Hendy mining equipment in its queue.
