= Chi1 Hydrae =

Star in the constellation Hydra

Chi^{1} Hydrae
- Location of χ^{1} Hydrae (circled in red)

Observation data Epoch J2000.0 Equinox J2000.0 (ICRS)
- Constellation: Hydra
- Right ascension: 11^{h} 05^{m} 19.90766^{s}
- Declination: −27° 17′ 36.9957″
- Apparent magnitude (V): 4.94

Characteristics
- Spectral type: F4 V + F7 V
- U−B color index: +0.04
- B−V color index: +0.36

Astrometry
| Radial velocity (R_{v}) | +19.1±1.6 km/s |
| Proper motion (μ) | RA: −190.728 mas/yr Dec.: −6.273 mas/yr |
| Parallax (π) | 22.8323±0.1828 mas |
| Distance | 143 ± 1 ly (43.8 ± 0.4 pc) |
| Absolute magnitude (M_{V}) | 1.74 |

Orbit
| Period (P) | 7.5535±0.0064 yr |
| Semi-major axis (a) | 0.1388±0.0016″ |
| Eccentricity (e) | 0.349±0.015 |
| Inclination (i) | 96.50±0.84° |
| Longitude of the node (Ω) | 224.00±0.59° |
| Periastron epoch (T) | 1983.455 ± 0.084 |
| Argument of periastron (ω) (secondary) | 343.0±4.3° |

Details

χ^{1} Hya A
| Mass | 1.93 M_{☉} |
| Radius | 3.19 R_{☉} |
| Luminosity | 17.798 L_{☉} |
| Temperature | 6,637 K |
| Metallicity [Fe/H] | −0.10 dex |
| Age | 1.3 Gyr |

χ^{1} Hya B
| Mass | 1.93 M_{☉} |

Other designations
- χ^{1} Hya, CD−26°8338, FK5 419, GJ 3642, HD 96202, HIP 54204, HR 4314, SAO 179514

Database references
| SIMBAD | data |

Chi^{1} Hydrae (χ^{1} Hydrae) is a binary star in the equatorial constellation of Hydra. It originally received the Flamsteed designation of 9 Crateris before being placed in Hydra. Based upon an annual parallax shift of 22.8 mas as seen from Earth, it is located about 143 light years from the Sun. It is visible to the naked eye with a combined apparent visual magnitude of 4.94.

The two components of this system appear to have equal masses of 1.93 times the mass of the Sun. The pair circle each other with an orbital period of 7.55 years with an eccentricity of 0.35.
