= HD 100307 =

Star in the constellation Hydra

Observation data Epoch J2000 Equinox ICRS
- Constellation: Hydra
- Right ascension: 11^{h} 32^{m} 23.28291^{s}
- Declination: −26° 44′ 48.4974″
- Apparent magnitude (V): 6.16

Characteristics
- Spectral type: M2 III
- U−B color index: +1.99
- B−V color index: +1.67
- Variable type: Suspected

Astrometry
Radial velocity (R_{v})	+34.5±0.6 km/s
Proper motion (μ)	RA: −83.52 mas/yr Dec.: 19.85 mas/yr
Parallax (π)	4.54±0.36 mas
Distance	720 ± 60 ly (220 ± 20 pc)

Details
Radius	67.564 R_{☉}
Luminosity	687±72 L_{☉}
Temperature	3598±125 K

Other designations
- CD−26°8620, HD 100307, HIP 56293, HR 4445, SAO 179969

Database references
SIMBAD	data

HD 100307 is a suspected variable star in the constellation of Hydra. Its apparent magnitude is 6.16, but interstellar dust makes it appear 0.346 magnitudes dimmer than it should be. It is located some 340 light-years (104 parsecs) away, based on parallax.

HD 100307 is a M-type red giant. It has evolved from the main sequence to a radius of 67.6 times that of the Sun. It emits 687 times as much energy as the Sun at a surface temperature of 3,598 K.
