= Gamma Crateris =

Star in the constellation Crater

- Location of γ Crateris (circled)

Observation data Epoch J2000.0 Equinox J2000.0 (ICRS)
- Constellation: Crater
- Right ascension: 11^{h} 24^{m} 52.924^{s}
- Declination: −17° 41′ 02.443″
- Apparent magnitude (V): 4.06

Characteristics
- Evolutionary stage: main sequence
- Spectral type: A9 V
- U−B color index: +0.09
- B−V color index: +0.216±0.006

Astrometry
Radial velocity (R_{v})	+0.58±0.20 km/s
Proper motion (μ)	RA: −96.811 mas/yr Dec.: +3.650 mas/yr
Parallax (π)	37.7065±0.1972 mas
Distance	86.5 ± 0.5 ly (26.5 ± 0.1 pc)
Absolute magnitude (M_{V})	+2.05

Details

γ Crt A
Mass	1.83 M_{☉}
Radius	1.96 R_{☉}
Luminosity	18.8 L_{☉}
Surface gravity (log g)	4.21±0.14 cgs
Temperature	8,020±273 K
Metallicity [Fe/H]	−0.01 dex
Rotational velocity (v sin i)	144 km/s
Age	757 Myr

γ Crt B
Mass	0.76 M_{☉}
Radius	0.72 R_{☉}
Luminosity	0.24 L_{☉}
Surface gravity (log g)	4.60 cgs
Temperature	4,755 K

Other designations
- γ Crt, 15 Crateris, BD−16°3244, FK5 431, GC 15669, HD 99211, HIP 55705, HR 4405, SAO 156661, WDS J11249-1741A

Database references
SIMBAD	data

Gamma Crateris is a binary star system that is divisible with a small amateur telescope, and is located at the center of the southern constellation of Crater. Its name is a Bayer designation that is Latinized from γ Crateris and abbreviated Gamma Crt or γ Crt. This system is visible to the naked eye as a point of light with an apparent visual magnitude of 4.06. With an annual parallax shift of 37.71 mas as seen from Earth, this star is located at a distance of 86.5 light-years (26.5 pc) from the Sun. Based upon the motion of this system through space, it is a potential member of the Castor Moving Group.

== Properties ==
The primary, component A, is a white-hued A-type main sequence star with a stellar classification of A9 V. The star has an estimated 1.8 times the mass of the Sun and around twice the Sun's radius. It is about 757 million years old and is spinning rapidly with a projected rotational velocity of 144 km/s. The primary is radiating 18.8 times the solar luminosity from its photosphere at an effective temperature of 8,020 K. Based upon the detection of an infrared excess, the star may host an orbiting debris disk. However, this finding remains in doubt.

The star was confirmed by Gabriel Cristian Neagu and Jan Ovidiu Tercu as a variable of Delta Scuti type. The variability has an amplitude of 0.001 magnitudes and a main period of 0.03647 d (52.52 min). The variability was discovered during the datamining activity with the goal of increasing the student's investigative competences.

The companion, component B, is a magnitude 9.6 star with an estimated mass 75% that of the Sun. As of 2010, the companion was located at an angular separation of 4.98 arc seconds along a position angle of 93.1° relative to the primary. This is equivalent to a projected separation of 125.6 AU. This star may be the source of the X-ray emission detected coming from this system.
