= Kappa Crateris =

Star in the constellation Crater

- Location of κ Crateris (circled)

Observation data Epoch J2000.0 Equinox J2000.0 (ICRS)
- Constellation: Crater
- Right ascension: 11^{h} 27^{m} 09.51569^{s}
- Declination: −12° 21′ 24.2964″
- Apparent magnitude (V): 5.94

Characteristics
- Evolutionary stage: main sequence
- Spectral type: F5/6 III
- B−V color index: +0.49

Astrometry
Radial velocity (R_{v})	4.8±0.9 km/s
Proper motion (μ)	RA: −99.937 mas/yr Dec.: +23.947 mas/yr
Parallax (π)	14.2499±0.0320 mas
Distance	228.9 ± 0.5 ly (70.2 ± 0.2 pc)
Absolute magnitude (M_{V})	+3.08

Details
Mass	1.74+0.10 −0.02 M_{☉}
Radius	3.4 R_{☉}
Luminosity	17 L_{☉}
Surface gravity (log g)	3.69±0.02 cgs
Temperature	6,545±63 K
Metallicity [Fe/H]	+0.15±0.05 dex
Rotation	20.96 days
Rotational velocity (v sin i)	38.8 km/s
Age	1.5±0.2 Gyr

Other designations
- κ Crt, 16 Crateris, BD−11°3098, FK5 2914, HD 99564, HIP 55874, HR 4416, SAO 156685

Database references
SIMBAD	data

Kappa Crateris is a star in the southern constellation of Crater. Its name is a Bayer designation that is Latinized from κ Crateris and abbreviated Kappa Crt or κ Crt. This star has an apparent visual magnitude of 5.94, which, according to the Bortle scale, can be seen with the naked eye under dark suburban skies. The distance to this star, as determined from an annual parallax shift of 14.25 mas, is around 229 light-years (70 pc).

This is an evolved F-type giant star with a stellar classification of F5/6 III, where the F5/6 indicates the spectrum lies intermediate between types F5 and F6. It is an estimated 1.5 billion years old and is spinning with a projected rotational velocity of 39 km/s. Kappa Crateris has 1.74 times the mass of the Sun, and radiates 17 times the solar luminosity from its outer atmosphere at an effective temperature of 6,545 K.

Kappa Crateris has a visual companion: a magnitude 13.0 star located at an angular separation of 24.6 arc seconds along a position angle of 343°, as of 2000. Based on its Gaia parallax, it is a distant background object, unrelated to Kappa Crateris.
