= HD 99922 =

Double star in the constellation Crater

- Location of HD 99922 (circled in red)

Observation data Epoch J2000 Equinox ICRS
- Constellation: Crater
- HD 99922 A
- Right ascension: 11^{h} 29^{m} 38.619^{s}
- Declination: −24° 27′ 50.48″
- Apparent magnitude (V): 5.813
- HD 99922 B
- Right ascension: 11^{h} 29^{m} 39.219^{s}
- Declination: −24° 27′ 49.40″
- Apparent magnitude (V): 8.543

Characteristics

HD 99922 A
- Evolutionary stage: main sequence
- Spectral type: A0V
- B−V color index: +0.07

HD 99922 B
- Evolutionary stage: main sequence
- Spectral type: F1V

Astrometry

HD 99922 A
Radial velocity (R_{v})	−2.50 km/s
Proper motion (μ)	RA: −44.450 mas/yr Dec.: +15.779 mas/yr
Parallax (π)	8.6451±0.0395 mas
Distance	377 ± 2 ly (115.7 ± 0.5 pc)

HD 99922 B
Proper motion (μ)	RA: −50.386 mas/yr Dec.: +19.267 mas/yr
Parallax (π)	9.2333±0.0678 mas
Distance	353 ± 3 ly (108.3 ± 0.8 pc)

Details

HD 99922 A
Mass	2.2 M_{☉}
Radius	3.2 R_{☉}
Luminosity	55 L_{☉}
Surface gravity (log g)	4.05 cgs
Temperature	10,186 K
Metallicity [Fe/H]	+0.25 dex
Rotation	1.39 days
Rotational velocity (v sin i)	65 km/s
Age	510 Myr

HD 99922 B
Mass	1.3 M_{☉}
Radius	1.4 R_{☉}
Surface gravity (log g)	4.23 cgs
Temperature	6,449 K
Age	4.7 Gyr

Other designations
- CD−23°10009, HD 99922, HR 4428, ADS 8183 AB
- HD 99922 A: HIP 56078, SAO 179935
- HD 99922 B: SAO 179936

Database references
SIMBAD	AB
- A
- B

HD 99922 is a double star system in the constellation of Crater. It shines with an apparent visual magnitude of 5.77 from a distance of about 377 light years (116 parsecs) away from the Earth. The primary star is an A-type main sequence star; the secondary star is located about 8 arcseconds away. Given the discrepant parallaxes of the two stars, they are unlikely to be physically associated.

Other designations for the primary component include HR 4428 and HIP 56078.
