= HD 95808 =

Star in the constellation Crater

Observation data Epoch J2000 Equinox J2000
- Constellation: Crater
- Right ascension: 11^{h} 03^{m} 14.87928^{s}
- Declination: −11° 18′ 12.4984″
- Apparent magnitude (V): 5.50

Characteristics
- Evolutionary stage: red giant branch
- Spectral type: G7-IIIb
- B−V color index: +0.94

Astrometry
Radial velocity (R_{v})	−8.90±0.10 km/s
Proper motion (μ)	RA: −82.299 mas/yr Dec.: −106.645 mas/yr
Parallax (π)	10.3622±0.0926 mas
Distance	315 ± 3 ly (96.5 ± 0.9 pc)
Absolute magnitude (M_{V})	+0.44

Details
Mass	2.43±0.15 M_{☉}
Radius	10.10±0.76 R_{☉}
Luminosity	64.6 L_{☉}
Surface gravity (log g)	3.05±0.07 cgs
Temperature	5,029±34 K
Metallicity [Fe/H]	−0.04±0.03 dex
Rotational velocity (v sin i)	2.27±0.45 km/s
Age	680±130 Myr

Other designations
- BD−10°3184, HD 95808, HIP 54029, HR 4305, SAO 156421

Database references
SIMBAD	data

HD 95808 is a double star in the constellation of Crater. Its apparent magnitude is 5.50, but interstellar dust makes it appear 0.11 magnitudes dimmer than it should be. It is located some 315 light-years (96.5 parsecs) away, based on parallax.

HD 95808 is a G-type giant star. At an age of 680 million years old, it has swelled up to a radius of 10.1 times that of the Sun, and it is 2.43 times as massive. It emits 64.6 times as much energy as the Sun at a surface temperature of 5,029 K.
