= Theta Crateris =

Star in the constellation Crater

- Location of θ Crateris (circled in red)

Observation data Epoch J2000.0 Equinox J2000.0 (ICRS)
- Constellation: Crater
- Right ascension: 11^{h} 36^{m} 40.909^{s}
- Declination: −09° 48′ 08.002″
- Apparent magnitude (V): 4.70

Characteristics
- Spectral type: B9.5 Vn
- U−B color index: −0.18
- B−V color index: −0.08

Astrometry
Radial velocity (R_{v})	+2.09±3.78 km/s
Proper motion (μ)	RA: −59.995 mas/yr Dec.: +3.959 mas/yr
Parallax (π)	10.8503±0.1871 mas
Distance	301 ± 5 ly (92 ± 2 pc)
Absolute magnitude (M_{V})	+0.63

Details
Mass	2.79 M_{☉}
Radius	3.1 R_{☉}
Luminosity	107 L_{☉}
Surface gravity (log g)	3.96±0.14 cgs
Temperature	11,524±392 K
Rotational velocity (v sin i)	212 km/s
Age	117 Myr

Other designations
- θ Crt, 21 Crateris, BD−08°3202, FK5 1299, HD 100889, HIP 56633, HR 4468, SAO 138296

Database references
SIMBAD	data

Theta Crateris is a solitary star in the southern constellation of Crater. Its name is a Bayer designation that is Latinized from θ Crateris and abbreviated Theta Crt or θ Crt. It is a photometric-standard star that is faintly visible to the naked eye with an apparent visual magnitude of 4.70. With an annual parallax shift of 10.85 mas as seen from Earth, it is located approximately 301 light-years (92 pc) from the Sun. At that distance, the visual magnitude of the star is diminished by an extinction factor of 0.07 because of interstellar dust.

This is a B-type main sequence star with a stellar classification of B9.5 Vn, where the 'n' suffix indicates "nebulous" absorption lines due to rapid rotation. It is spinning with a projected rotational velocity of 212 km/s, giving the star an oblate shape with an equatorial bulge that is an estimated 7% larger than the polar radius. The star has 2.79 times the mass of the Sun and around 3.1 times the Sun's radius. With an age of about 117 million years, it is radiating 107 times the solar luminosity from its outer atmosphere at an effective temperature of 11,524 K.
