= Lambda Crateris =

Binary star in the constellation Crater

Observation data Epoch J2000.0 Equinox J2000.0 (ICRS)
- Constellation: Crater
- Right ascension: 11^{h} 23^{m} 21.88147^{s}
- Declination: −18° 46′ 48.1281″
- Apparent magnitude (V): 5.08

Characteristics
- Spectral type: F5 III
- U−B color index: −0.04
- B−V color index: +0.43

Astrometry
| Radial velocity (R_{v}) | +13.26±0.60 km/s |
| Proper motion (μ) | RA: −319.253 mas/yr Dec.: −17.823 mas/yr |
| Parallax (π) | 22.0397±0.1689 mas |
| Distance | 148 ± 1 ly (45.4 ± 0.3 pc) |
| Absolute magnitude (M_{V}) | +1.92 |

Orbit
| Period (P) | 2,849±3 days |
| Semi-major axis (a) | 5.0±0.3 AU |
| Eccentricity (e) | 0.323±0.004 |
| Inclination (i) | 124.9±0.7° |
| Longitude of the node (Ω) | 129.0±1.3° |
| Periastron epoch (T) | 2,455,898±5 HJD |
| Argument of periastron (ω) (secondary) | 27.8±0.8° |
| Semi-amplitude (K_{1}) (primary) | 2.5 km/s |

Details

A
| Mass | 1.45±0.08 M_{☉} |
| Radius | 2.8 R_{☉} |
| Luminosity | 14.4 L_{☉} |
| Surface gravity (log g) | 4.06±0.11 cgs |
| Temperature | 6,582±54 K |
| Metallicity [Fe/H] | −0.15±0.01 dex |
| Rotational velocity (v sin i) | 17.0 km/s |

B
| Mass | 0.57±0.08 M_{☉} |

Other designations
- λ Crt, 13 Crateris, BD−17°3367, HD 98991, HIP 55598, HR 4395, SAO 156646

Database references
| SIMBAD | data |

Lambda Crateris is a binary star system in the southern constellation of Crater. Its name is a Bayer designation that is Latinized from λ Crateris, and abbreviated Lambda Crt or λ Crt. With an annual parallax shift of 22.04 milliarcseconds as observed from Earth, it is located at a distance of 148 light years. It is faintly visible to the naked eye with an apparent visual magnitude of 5.08.

This is a probable astrometric binary star system, with orbital elements first reported by Abt and Levy (1976). However, Morbey and Griffin (1987) later cast some doubt on the validity of these results, suggesting that further review is needed. An updated orbital solution was presented in 2023, giving an orbital period of 2,849 days (7.80 years), a semi-major axis of 5.0 AU, an eccentricity of 0.323 and an inclination of 125°.

The primary member of this system, component A, is an evolved F-type giant star with a stellar classification of F5 III. It has an estimated 1.78 times the mass of the Sun and 2.8 times the Sun's radius. The star is spinning with a projected rotational velocity of 17 km/s.

The secondary component is a white dwarf of 0.57 times the mass of the Sun. When it was passing by the asymptotic giant branch, mass loss caused s-process elements, produced by nucleosynthesis, to be transferred to the primary. One of those elements is barium, which makes the primary component a barium star.
