= Epsilon Crateris =

Solitary star in the constellation Crater

- Location of ε Crateris (circled)

Observation data Epoch J2000.0 Equinox J2000.0 (ICRS)
- Constellation: Crater
- Right ascension: 11^{h} 24^{m} 36.591^{s}
- Declination: −10° 51′ 33.576″
- Apparent magnitude (V): 4.81

Characteristics
- Spectral type: K5 III
- U−B color index: +1.87
- B−V color index: +1.556±0.005

Astrometry
| Radial velocity (R_{v}) | +2.0±0.6 km/s |
| Proper motion (μ) | RA: −25.154 mas/yr Dec.: +24.689 mas/yr |
| Parallax (π) | 8.1780±0.1653 mas |
| Distance | 399 ± 8 ly (122 ± 2 pc) |
| Absolute magnitude (M_{V}) | −0.43±0.18 |

Details
| Mass | 0.99±0.08 M_{☉} |
| Radius | 44.7 R_{☉} |
| Luminosity | 391 L_{☉} |
| Surface gravity (log g) | 1.61 cgs |
| Temperature | 3,930 K |
| Metallicity [Fe/H] | −0.38 dex |
| Rotational velocity (v sin i) | 10 km/s |

Other designations
- ε Crt, 14 Crateris, BD−10°3260, HD 99167, HIP 55687, HR 4402, SAO 156658

Database references
| SIMBAD | data |

Epsilon Crateris is a solitary star in the southern constellation of Crater. Its name is a Bayer designation that is Latinized from ε Crateris and abbreviated ε Crt or ε Crt. Visible to the naked eye, it has an apparent visual magnitude of 4.81. With an annual parallax shift of 8.1780 mas as seen from the Earth, its estimated distance is approximately 399 light-years (122 pc) 376 light years from the Sun.

This is an evolved K-type giant star with a stellar classification of K5 III. It has about the same mass as the Sun, but has expanded to 44.7 times the Sun's radius. The star is radiating 391 times the solar luminosity from its outer atmosphere at an effective temperature of 3,930 K.
