= Iota Crateris =

Star in the constellation Crater

- Location of ι Crateris (circled)

Observation data Epoch J2000.0 Equinox J2000.0 (ICRS)
- Constellation: Crater
- Right ascension: 11^{h} 38^{m} 40.018^{s}
- Declination: −13° 12′ 06.981″
- Apparent magnitude (V): 5.48

Characteristics
- Spectral type: F6.5 V
- B−V color index: +0.52

Astrometry
| Radial velocity (R_{v}) | −26.6±0.3 km/s |
| Proper motion (μ) | RA: +91.849 mas/yr Dec.: +125.335 mas/yr |
| Parallax (π) | 37.245±0.073 mas |
| Distance | 87.6 ± 0.2 ly (26.85 ± 0.05 pc) |
| Absolute magnitude (M_{V}) | +3.33 |

Details

ι Crt A
| Mass | 1.19+0.06 −0.02 M_{☉} |
| Surface gravity (log g) | 4.27±0.03 cgs |
| Temperature | 6,230±21 K |
| Metallicity [Fe/H] | −0.15±0.01 dex |
| Age | 4.45+0.32 −0.94 Gyr |

ι Crt B
| Mass | 0.57 M_{☉} |

Other designations
- ι Crt, 24 Crateris, BD−12°3466, GC 15977, GJ 3677, HD 101198, HIP 56802, HR 4488, SAO 156802, WDS J11387-1312A

Database references
| SIMBAD | data |
- C

Iota Crateris is a triple star system in the southern constellation of Crater. Its name is a Bayer designation that is Latinied from ι Crateris and abbreviated Iota Crt or ι Crt. This system is faintly visible to the naked eye as a point of light with an apparent visual magnitude of 5.48. According to the Bortle scale, this means it can be viewed from suburban skies at night. Based upon an annual parallax shift of 37.25 mas, Iota Crateris is located at a distance of 87.6 light-years (26.9 pc) 87 light years from the Sun.

This is an astrometric binary system with an estimated orbital period of roughly 79,000 years. The primary, component A, is an F-type main sequence star with a stellar classification of F6.5 V, which is generating energy through the thermonuclear fusion of hydrogen in its core region. It is around 4.45 billion years old with 1.19 times the mass of the Sun. The star is radiating energy from its outer atmosphere at an effective temperature of 6,230 K.

The close companion, component B, is a red dwarf star with a probable classification of M3, although its mass estimate of 0.57 solar would be more consistent with an M0 class star. As of 2014, this magnitude 11.0 star had an angular separation of 1.10 arc seconds along a position angle of 248°. It has a projected separation of 25 AU, which means it is positioned at least this distance away from the primary.

A white dwarf 92 arcseconds away is at the same distance and shares a common proper motion with the other two stars. It is referred to as component C of the system, but has the separate designation UCAC4 384-059519.

== SETI observations ==
In 2023, Ma et al. identified a narrowband radio signal of interest in the direction of Iota Crateris, designated MLc6, from a deep learning-based technosignature search of 820 nearby stars conducted with the Robert C. Byrd Green Bank Telescope as part of the Breakthrough Listen program. The signal was found in archival 2016 observations at a frequency of 1435.940 MHz, with a Doppler drift rate of −0.18 Hz s^{−1} and a signal-to-noise ratio of approximately 40, and was one of eight candidate signals identified across the full survey. Follow-up re-observations in May 2022 did not recover the signal, indicating it is not persistent in time.

An independent analysis by Margot et al. (2023) could not process the signal with their pipeline, as its drift rate exceeded the operational range of their search algorithm when applied to the available reduced data products; the authors noted it might have been recoverable had the original raw voltage data been preserved. Of the five candidate signals from the same survey that their pipeline did process, all were identified as radio frequency interference.
