= Mu Hydrae =

Star in the constellation Hydra

μ Hydrae
- Location of μ Hydrae (circled in red)

Observation data Epoch J2000.0 Equinox J2000.0 (ICRS)
- Constellation: Hydra
- Right ascension: 10^{h} 26^{m} 05.42630^{s}
- Declination: −14° 19′ 56.2675″
- Apparent magnitude (V): 3.83

Characteristics
- Spectral type: K4 III
- U−B color index: +1.83
- B−V color index: +1.47
- Variable type: Suspected

Astrometry
Radial velocity (R_{v})	+40.81±0.36 km/s
Proper motion (μ)	RA: −129.17 mas/yr Dec.: −79.76 mas/yr
Parallax (π)	13.93±0.18 mas
Distance	234 ± 3 ly (71.8 ± 0.9 pc)
Absolute magnitude (M_{V})	−0.45

Details
Radius	45 R_{☉}
Luminosity	332 L_{☉}
Surface gravity (log g)	1.5 cgs
Temperature	3,999±8 K
Metallicity [Fe/H]	−0.12 dex
Rotational velocity (v sin i)	6.0 km/s

Other designations
- μ Hya, 42 Hydrae, BD−16°3052, FK5 389, HD 90432, HIP 51069, HR 4094, SAO 155980.

Database references
SIMBAD	data

μ Hydrae, Latinised as Mu Hydrae, is a solitary, orange-hued star in the equatorial constellation of Hydra. It is visible to the naked eye with an apparent visual magnitude of 3.83. Positioned just 1.8° to the south-southwest is the planetary nebula NGC 3242. Mu Hydrae has an annual parallax shift of 13.93 mas, which yields a distance estimate of 234 light years.

This is an evolved K-type giant star with a stellar classification of K4 III, having used up its core hydrogen and has expanded to around 45 times the radius of the Sun. It is a suspected variable star, with a brightness that varies about 0.03 in magnitude. The relatively cool outer atmosphere has an effective temperature of 3999 K.
