= Nu Hydrae =

Star in the constellation Hydra

- Location of ν Hydrae (circled)

Observation data Epoch J2000 Equinox ICRS
- Constellation: Hydra
- Right ascension: 10^{h} 49^{m} 37.48875^{s}
- Declination: −16° 11′ 37.1360″
- Apparent magnitude (V): 3.115

Characteristics
- Spectral type: K0/K1 III
- U−B color index: +1.305
- B−V color index: +1.239

Astrometry
Radial velocity (R_{v})	−1.37±0.25 km/s
Proper motion (μ)	RA: +93.35 mas/yr Dec.: +198.88 mas/yr
Parallax (π)	23.7940±0.1695 mas
Distance	137.1 ± 1.0 ly (42.0 ± 0.3 pc)
Absolute magnitude (M_{V})	−0.11

Details
Mass	2.0 M_{☉}
Radius	21 R_{☉}
Luminosity	151 L_{☉}
Surface gravity (log g)	2.3 cgs
Temperature	4,335 K
Metallicity [Fe/H]	−0.30 dex
Rotational velocity (v sin i)	5.3 km/s

Other designations
- ν Hya, 4 Crateris, BD−15 3138, FK5 410, HD 93813, HIP 52943, HR 4232, SAO 156256

Database references
SIMBAD	data

Nu Hydrae, Latinized from ν Hydrae, is an orange-hued star in the constellation Hydra, near the border with the neighboring constellation of Crater. It has an apparent visual magnitude of 3.115, which is bright enough to be seen with the naked eye. Based upon parallax measurements, this star is located at a distance of about 137 light-years (42 parsecs) from the Earth.

The spectrum of this star matches a stellar classification of K0/K1 III, where the luminosity class of 'III' indicates this is a giant star that has exhausted the supply of hydrogen at its core and evolved away from the main sequence. The radius of this star has expanded to 21 times the Sun's radius and it radiates about 151 times the luminosity of the Sun. This expanded outer envelope has an effective temperature of about 4,335 K, giving it the characteristic orange hue of a K-type star.

Nu Hydrae is an X-ray emitter with an estimated luminosity of 6.6 × 10^{28} erg s^{−1} in the X-ray band. The abundance of elements other than hydrogen and helium, what astronomers term the star's metallicity, is about half that in the Sun. (Note: The actual abundance of metals relative to the abundance in the Sun can be derived by taking the metallicity estimate to the power of ten, thus: 10^{[Fe/H]} = 10^{−0.30} ≈ 0.50) It has a relatively high proper motion across the celestial sphere, suggesting that it has a peculiar velocity roughly three times higher than its neighbors.

Nu Hydrae was a later designation of 4 Crateris.
