= List of stars in Crater =

This is the list of notable stars in the constellation Crater, sorted by decreasing brightness.

| Name | B | F | Var | HD | HIP | RA | Dec | vis. mag. | abs. mag. | Dist. (ly) | Sp. class | Notes |
|---|---|---|---|---|---|---|---|---|---|---|---|---|
| δ Crt | δ | 12 | | 98430 | 55282 | 11^{h} 19^{m} 20.52^{s} | −14° 46′ 44.6″ | 3.56 | −0.32 | 195 | K0III | |
| γ Crt | γ | 15 | | 99211 | 55705 | 11^{h} 24^{m} 52.98^{s} | −17° 41′ 02.5″ | 4.06 | 2.01 | 84 | A9V | double star |
| α Crt | α | 7 | | 95272 | 53740 | 10^{h} 59^{m} 46.75^{s} | −18° 17′ 56.8″ | 4.08 | 0.44 | 174 | K1III | Alkes, Aoul al Batjna, Prima Crateris |
| β Crt | β | 11 | | 97277 | 54682 | 11^{h} 11^{m} 39.49^{s} | −22° 49′ 32.2″ | 4.46 | −0.10 | 266 | A1V | Al Sharāsīf II |
| θ Crt | θ | 21 | | 100889 | 56633 | 11^{h} 36^{m} 40.95^{s} | −09° 48′ 08.1″ | 4.70 | −0.15 | 305 | B9.5Vn | |
| ζ Crt | ζ | 27 | | 102070 | 57283 | 11^{h} 44^{m} 45.76^{s} | −18° 21′ 02.2″ | 4.71 | −0.45 | 350 | G8III | |
| ε Crt | ε | 14 | | 99167 | 55687 | 11^{h} 24^{m} 36.61^{s} | −10° 51′ 33.8″ | 4.81 | −0.43 | 364 | K5III | |
| λ Crt | λ | 13 | | 98991 | 55598 | 11^{h} 23^{m} 22.07^{s} | −18° 46′ 47.6″ | 5.08 | 1.87 | 143 | F3IV | spectroscopic binary |
| η Crt | η | 30 | | 103632 | 58188 | 11^{h} 56^{m} 00.98^{s} | −17° 09′ 02.9″ | 5.17 | 0.46 | 285 | A0V | |
| ι Crt | ι | 24 | | 101198 | 56802 | 11^{h} 38^{m} 39.96^{s} | −13° 12′ 08.1″ | 5.48 | 3.32 | 88 | F7V | double star |
| HD 95808 | | | | 95808 | 54029 | 11^{h} 03^{m} 14.93^{s} | −11° 18′ 11.6″ | 5.51 | 0.56 | 318 | G7III... | double star |
| HD 94481 | | | | 94481 | 53316 | 10^{h} 54^{m} 17.78^{s} | −13° 45′ 29.0″ | 5.65 | 0.16 | 409 | K0III + (G) | |
| HD 99922 | | | | 99922 | 56078 | 11^{h} 29^{m} 38.65^{s} | −24° 27′ 50.6″ | 5.77 | 0.31 | 403 | A0V | double star; suspected variable |
| HD 95314 | | | | 95314 | 53778 | 11^{h} 00^{m} 11.70^{s} | −14° 04′ 59.9″ | 5.86 | 0.20 | 442 | K5III | suspected variable |
| HD 95234 | | | | 95234 | 53723 | 10^{h} 59^{m} 30.95^{s} | −16° 21′ 13.3″ | 5.88 | −1.92 | 1185 | M1III | variable star, ΔV = 0.011^{m}, P = 0.09041 d |
| κ Crt | κ | 16 | | 99564 | 55874 | 11^{h} 27^{m} 09.58^{s} | −12° 21′ 24.5″ | 5.93 | 1.80 | 219 | F4III-IV | Al Sharāsīf I; double star |
| HD 100343 | | | | 100343 | 56318 | 11^{h} 32^{m} 47.54^{s} | −07° 49′ 39.1″ | 5.94 | −0.29 | 575 | K4III | |
| HD 100418 | | | | 100418 | 56364 | 11^{h} 33^{m} 14.81^{s} | −16° 16′ 49.0″ | 6.05 | 0.60 | 400 | F8/G0Ib/II | |
| HD 96220 | | | | 96220 | 54214 | 11^{h} 05^{m} 33.98^{s} | −11° 05′ 19.4″ | 6.09 | 2.05 | 209 | F0Vn | |
| ψ Crt | ψ | | | 97411 | 54742 | 11^{h} 12^{m} 30.38^{s} | −18° 29′ 59.3″ | 6.11 | 0.28 | 479 | A0V | double star |
| HD 98088 | | | SV | 98088 | 55106 | 11^{h} 16^{m} 58.18^{s} | −07° 08′ 04.9″ | 6.11 | 0.56 | 421 | A2p... | Abt's Star; spectroscopic binary; α^{2} CVn variable |
| HD 102845 | | | | 102845 | 57732 | 11^{h} 50^{m} 19.60^{s} | −15° 51′ 49.3″ | 6.13 | −0.44 | 672 | G8II/III | |
| VX Crt | | | VX | 101370 | 56899 | 11^{h} 39^{m} 50.35^{s} | −16° 37′ 12.8″ | 6.17 | −1.29 | 1012 | M3II/III | semiregular variable |
| HD 101369 | | | | 101369 | 56901 | 11^{h} 39^{m} 51.14^{s} | −14° 28′ 06.6″ | 6.21 | −0.10 | 597 | A0V | double star |
| HD 101695 | | | | 101695 | 57079 | 11^{h} 42^{m} 03.53^{s} | −20° 17′ 38.5″ | 6.21 | 1.93 | 234 | G8IV | |
| HD 100219 | | | | 100219 | 56245 | 11^{h} 31^{m} 47.63^{s} | −20° 46′ 35.6″ | 6.24 | 3.26 | 129 | F7V | |
| HD 102574 | | | | 102574 | 57587 | 11^{h} 48^{m} 23.55^{s} | −10° 18′ 46.2″ | 6.24 | 3.09 | 139 | F7V | triple star |
| HD 94386 | | | | 94386 | 53259 | 10^{h} 53^{m} 32.86^{s} | −15° 26′ 44.5″ | 6.34 | 1.91 | 251 | K2III | |
| HD 95870 | | | | 95870 | 54048 | 11^{h} 03^{m} 36.53^{s} | −13° 26′ 05.7″ | 6.34 | 0.21 | 549 | G8III | |
| HD 102990 | | | | 102990 | 57819 | 11^{h} 51^{m} 22.04^{s} | −12° 11′ 16.5″ | 6.34 | 3.08 | 147 | F1III-IV | |
| HD 95441 | | | | 95441 | 53849 | 11^{h} 00^{m} 57.34^{s} | −15° 47′ 33.3″ | 6.35 | 0.13 | 572 | K0III | |
| HD 97428 | | | | 97428 | 54749 | 11^{h} 12^{m} 34.79^{s} | −21° 44′ 57.7″ | 6.39 | −0.22 | 685 | K3III | |
| HD 101259 | | | | 101259 | 56830 | 11^{h} 39^{m} 00.42^{s} | −24° 43′ 13.8″ | 6.40 | 2.34 | 211 | G6/G8V | |
| SY Crt | | | SY | 97918 | 54999 | 11^{h} 15^{m} 39.77^{s} | −12° 35′ 33.3″ | 6.58 | | 797 | M3III | semiregular variable, V_{max} = 6.34^{m}, V_{min} = 6.62^{m} |
| HD 98649 | | | | 98649 | 55409 | 11^{h} 20^{m} 52^{s} | −23° 13′ 02″ | 8.03 | | 131 | G4V | has a planet (b) |
| HD 96167 | | | | 96167 | 54195 | 11^{h} 05^{m} 15.07^{s} | −10° 17′ 28.68″ | 8.08 | 3.46 | 273 | G5 | has a planet (b) |
| HD 98219 | | | | 98219 | 55174 | 11^{h} 17^{m} 48^{s} | −23° 58′ 31″ | 8.21 | | 437 | K0III/IV | Hunahpú; has a planet (b) |
| HD 99563 | | | XY | 99563 | 55890 | 11^{h} 27^{m} 16.64^{s} | −08° 52′ 08.2″ | 8.67 | | 832 | F0 | rapidly oscillating Ap star |
| HD 98800 | | | TV | 98800 | 55505 | 11^{h} 22^{m} 05.29^{s} | −24° 46′ 39.8″ | 8.94 | | 146.4 | K4V+... | T Tauri star, ΔV = 0.09^{m}, P = 2.52 d |
| S Crt | | | S | 103154 | 57917 | 11^{h} 52^{m} 45.10^{s} | −07° 35′ 48.1″ | 9.14 | | 2590 | M... | semiregular variable |
| R Crt | | | R | 95384 | 53809 | 11^{h} 00^{m} 33.85^{s} | −18° 19′ 29.6″ | 9.80 | | 851 | M7III... | semiregular variable |
| HD 95872 | | | | 95872 | | 11^{h} 03^{m} 28.0^{s} | −22° 05′ 38″ | 9.90 | | 237 | K0V | has a planet (b) |
| BD-10°3166 | | | | | | 10^{h} 58^{m} 28.78^{s} | −18° 19′ 29.6″ | 10.08 | 5.96 | 218 | G4V | member of LDS 4041 pair of stars; has a planet (b) |
| V Crt | | | V | | | 11^{h} 21^{m} 13.43^{s} | −16° 40′ 23.1″ | 10.26 | | | A6 | Algol variable |
| WASP-34 | | | | | | 11^{h} 01^{m} 36^{s} | −23° 51′ 38″ | 10.4 | | 391 | G5 | Amansinaya, has a transiting planet (b) |
| W Crt | | | W | | 55825 | 11^{h} 26^{m} 29.64^{s} | −17° 54′ 51.7″ | 11.70 | | | F4 | RR Lyr variable, V_{max} = 10.769^{m}, V_{min} = 12.182^{m}, P = 0.4120134 d |
| WASP-31 | | | | | | 11^{h} 17^{m} 45^{s} | −19° 03′ 17″ | 11.7 | | 1300 | F | has a transiting planet (b) |
| HATS-1 | | | | | | 11^{h} 42^{m} 06.0^{s} | −23° 21′ 17″ | 12.05 | | 988 | | has a planet (b) |
| WASP-162 | | | | | | 11^{h} 13^{m} 10.0^{s} | −17° 39′ 28″ | 12.2 | | | K0 | has a transiting planet (b) |
| HATS-2 | | | | | | 11^{h} 46^{m} 57.4^{s} | −22° 33′ 47″ | 13.56 | | 1174 | K | has a planet (b) |
| TT Crt | | | TT | | | 11^{h} 34^{m} 47.18^{s} | −11° 45′ 30.4″ | 15.3 | | | F4 | dwarf nova, V_{max} = 12.5^{m}, V_{min} = 15.3^{m}, P = 0.26842 d |
| DENIS-P J1058.7-1548 | | | | | | 10^{h} 58^{m} 47.87^{s} | −15° 48′ 17.2″ | | | 56.5 | L3V | brown dwarf |
Table legend: • Name = Proper name • B = Bayer designation • F or/and G. = Flamsteed designation or Gould designation • Var = Variable star designation • HD = Henry Draper Catalogue designation number • HIP = Hipparcos Catalogue designation number • RA = Right ascension for the Epoch/Equinox J2000.0 • Dec = Declination for the Epoch/Equinox J2000.0 • vis. mag. = visual magnitude (m or m_{v}), also known as apparent magnitude • abs. mag. = absolute magnitude (M_{v}) • Dist. (ly) = Distance in light-years from Earth • Sp. class = Spectral class of the star in the stellar classification system • Notes = Common name(s) or alternate name(s); comments; notable properties [for example: multiple star status, range of variability if it is a variable star, exoplanets, etc.]
