= NGC 3962 =

Galaxy in the constellation Crater

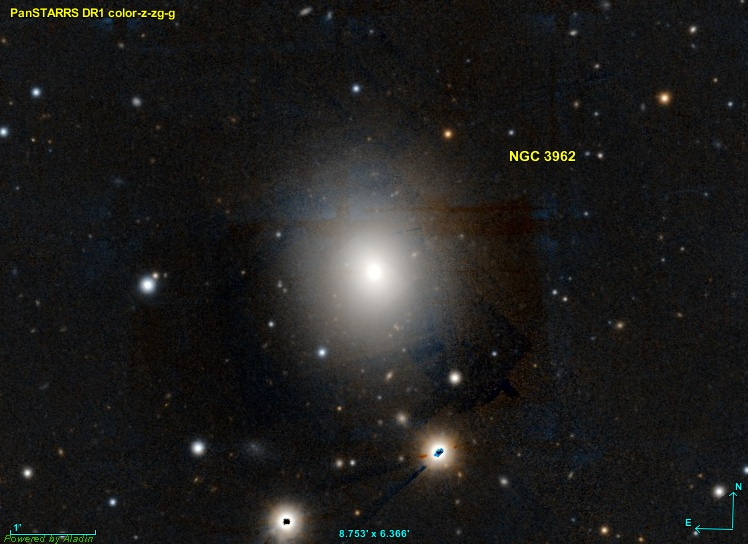
- Pan-STARRS image of NGC 3962

Observation data (J2000 epoch)
- Constellation: Crater
- Right ascension: 11^{h} 54^{m} 40.099^{s}
- Declination: −13° 58′ 30.235″
- Redshift: 0.006054±0.00006
- Heliocentric radial velocity: 1,818±17 km/s
- Distance: 118.4 ± 7.6 Mly (36.3 ± 2.34 Mpc)
- Group or cluster: Crater Cloud
- Apparent magnitude (V): 11.1

Characteristics
- Type: E1
- Number of stars: 131.5×10^{9} M_{☉}
- Apparent size (V): 2.6′ × 2.2′

Other designations
- 2MASX J11544010-1358299, NGC 3962, LEDA 37366, MCG -02-30-040

NGC 3962 is an elliptical galaxy in the southern constellation of Crater. It can be spotted in a small telescope as a fuzzy blob about 3° north-northwest of the star Eta Crateris. This feature was discovered on February 8, 1785 by German-British astronomer William Herschel. It has an apparent visual magnitude of 11.1 and an angular size of 2.6′ × 2.2′. The distance to NGC 3962 is approximately 118 million light years. It is a member of the Crater Cloud filament of galaxies, although there are no significant nearby companions and it lacks any indication of tidal disturbance from past interactions.

The morphological classification of NGC 3962 is E1, indicating a nearly spherical elliptical galaxy. It has an ellipticity of 0.28 with the major axis oriented along a position angle of 10.0°. There is no clear disk structure, although the isophotal shape profile suggests a disk-like appearance in the outskirts. The galaxy displays some signatures of past accretion causing star formation in the nucleus. A weak radio source was detected at the core in 1985.

The neutral hydrogen in the galaxy has a combined mass of 2.8×10^{9} M_{☉}. The extent of this neutral gas is 2.7 times larger than the photometric diameter. Based on observations in the far infrared, the galaxy has a diffuse dust component with a mass of 2.71×10^{5} M_{☉} at a mean temperature of 12 K. The galaxy contains two distinct regions of ionized gas: an inner disk and an arc-like structure. The disk is misaligned with the galaxy profile, showing an inclination of 45° and an orientation along a position angle of 70°.

NGC 3962 has a rich galactic cluster system with 557 candidate globular clusters. The 17 brightest of these may be ultra compact dwarfs. The nucleus activity is catalogued as the LINER type, with a supermassive black hole mass estimated at 8.51×10^{8} M_{☉}.
