= 1ES 1101−232 =

Galactic nucleus in a distant galaxy cluster in the constellation Crater

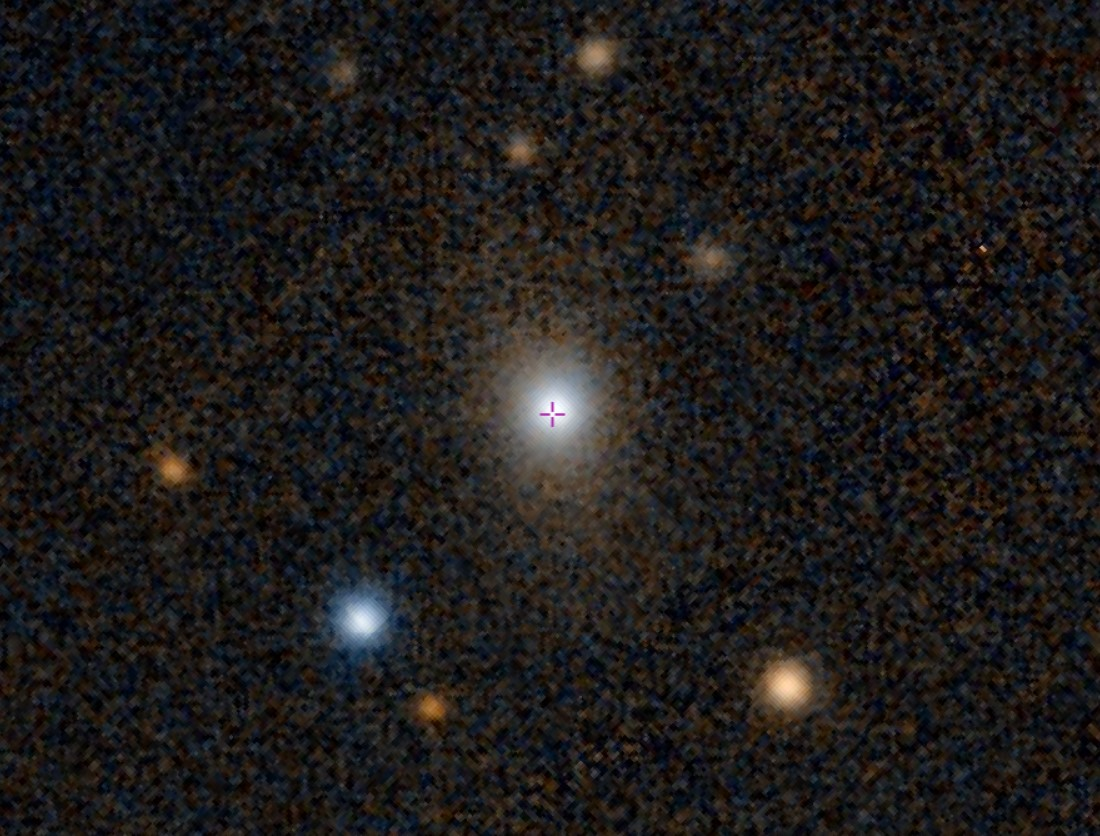
- The blazar 1ES 1101−232 taken by Pan-STARRS.

Observation data (Epoch J2000)
- Constellation: Crater
- Right ascension: 11^{h} 03^{m} 37.6150843895^{s}
- Declination: −23° 29′ 31.202114088″
- Redshift: 0.186
- Distance: 2.445 Gly (749.64 Mpc)
- Type: BL Lac
- Apparent magnitude (V): 16.55

Other designations
- 2FHL J1104.0−2331, PGC 3765110, TXS 1101−232, 2MASX J11033765−2329307, RBS 0936

1ES 1101−232 is an active galactic nucleus of a distant galaxy known as a blazar. It is also a BL Lac object.

An X-ray source (catalogued as A 1059−22) was first recorded by Maccagni and colleagues in a 1978 paper; they thought the source arose from a galaxy in the Abell 1146 galaxy cluster, which contained many giant elliptical galaxies. In 1989, Remillard and colleagues linked the X-ray source with a visual object and established that the object was surrounded by a large elliptical galaxy. They also discovered that the object (and galaxy) were more distant, with a redshift of 0.186. The host galaxy appears to be part of a distant galaxy cluster.

Between 2004 and 2005, 1ES 1101−232 showed gamma-ray emission which was detected by the High Energy Stereoscopic System of Atmospheric Cherenkov Telescope. Astronomers observed it for 43 hours, which they studied the blazar for its inner jets and the extragalactic background light. In November 2023, an X-ray flare was detected in 1ES 1101–232.
