= NGC 3974 =

Galaxy in the constellation Crater

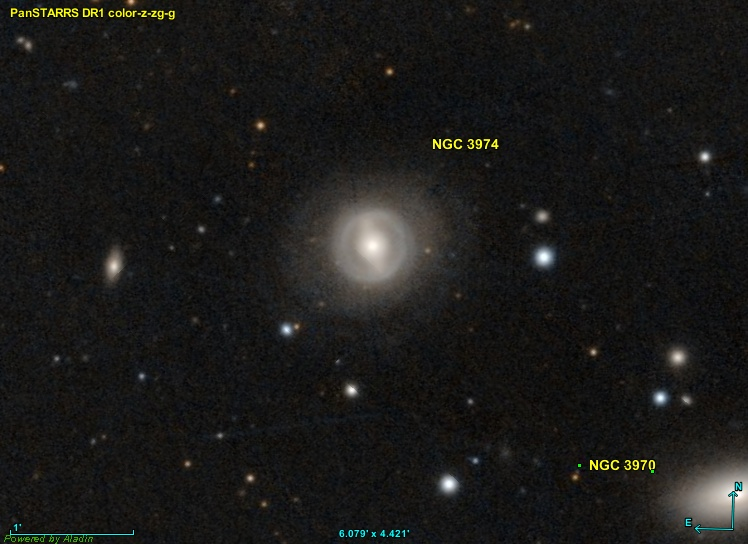
- NGC 3974 imaged by Pan-STARRS

Observation data (J2000 epoch)
- Constellation: Crater
- Right ascension: 11^{h} 55^{m} 40.174^{s}
- Declination: −12° 01′ 38.431″
- Redshift: 0.019133
- Heliocentric radial velocity: 5736 ± 32 km/s
- Distance: 293.4 ± 20.7 Mly (89.96 ± 6.34 Mpc)
- Apparent magnitude (V): 13.4

Characteristics
- Type: (R')SB0/a?(r)
- Size: ~80,500 ly (24.67 kpc) (estimated)
- Apparent size (V): 1.2′ × 1.1′

Other designations
- 2MASX J11554013-1201386, MCG -02-31-001, PGC 37452

NGC 3974 is a lenticular galaxy in the constellation of Crater. Its velocity with respect to the cosmic microwave background is 6099 ± 41 km/s, which corresponds to a Hubble distance of 89.96 ± 6.34 Mpc (~293 million light-years). However, one non-redshift measurement gives a much closer distance of 56.6 Mpc (185 Mly). It was discovered by British astronomer John Herschel on 9 March 1828.

NGC 3974 is possibly a LINER galaxy, i.e. it has a type of nucleus that is defined by its spectral line emission which has weakly ionized or neutral atoms, while the spectral line emission from strongly ionized atoms is relatively weak.

One supernova has been observed in NGC 3974: SN 2024gra (Type Ia, mag. 18.8625) was discovered by the Automatic Learning for the Rapid Classification of Events (ALeRCE) on 16 April 2024.

== See also ==
- List of NGC objects (3001–4000)
