= NGC 3836 =

Galaxy in the constellation Crater

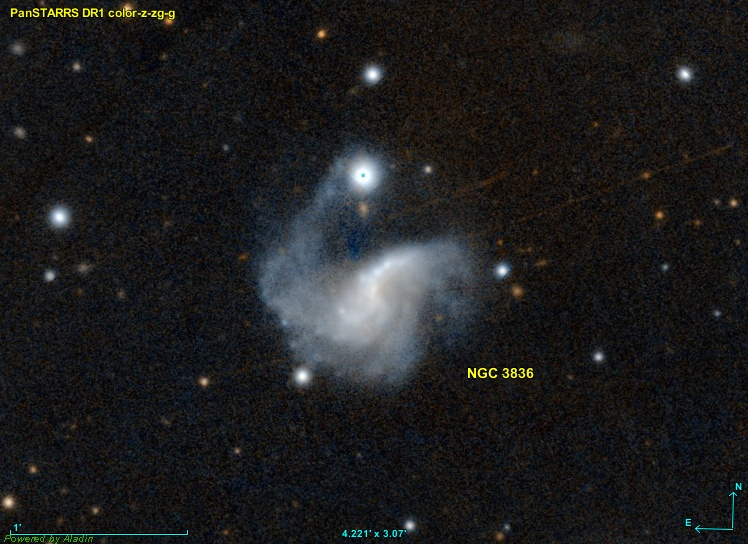
- NGC 3836 imaged by SDSS

Observation data (J2000 epoch)
- Constellation: Crater
- Right ascension: 11^{h} 43^{m} 29.7872^{s}
- Declination: −16° 47′ 45.244″
- Redshift: 0.012208±0.0000200
- Heliocentric radial velocity: 3,660±6 km/s
- Distance: 193.5 ± 13.6 Mly (59.32 ± 4.17 Mpc)
- Apparent magnitude (V): 13.5

Characteristics
- Type: Sb pec
- Size: ~78,900 ly (24.19 kpc) (estimated)
- Apparent size (V): 1.4′ × 1.3′

Other designations
- IRAS 11409-1631, MCG -03-30-010, PGC 36445, VV 477

NGC 3836 is a peculiar spiral galaxy in the constellation of Crater. Its velocity with respect to the cosmic microwave background is 4,022±26 km/s, which corresponds to a Hubble distance of 193.5 ± 13.6 Mly (59.32 ± 4.17 Mpc). It was discovered by German astronomer Wilhelm Tempel on 29 April 1877.

NGC 3836 is an active galaxy nucleus candidate, i.e. it has a compact region at the center of a galaxy that emits a significant amount of energy across the electromagnetic spectrum, with characteristics indicating that this luminosity is not produced by the stars.

== Supernovae ==
Three supernovae have been observed in NGC 3836:

- SN 2017rt (Type Ic, mag. 17.47) was discovered by Pan-STARRS on 10 January 2017.
- SN 2020aqe (Type II, mag. 18.269) was discovered by ATLAS on 23 January 2020.
- SN 2021aefs (Type IIn, mag. 18.36) was discovered by Gaia Photometric Science Alerts on 9 November 2021.

== See also ==
- List of NGC objects (3001–4000)
