= NGC 3660 =

Galaxy in the constellation Crater

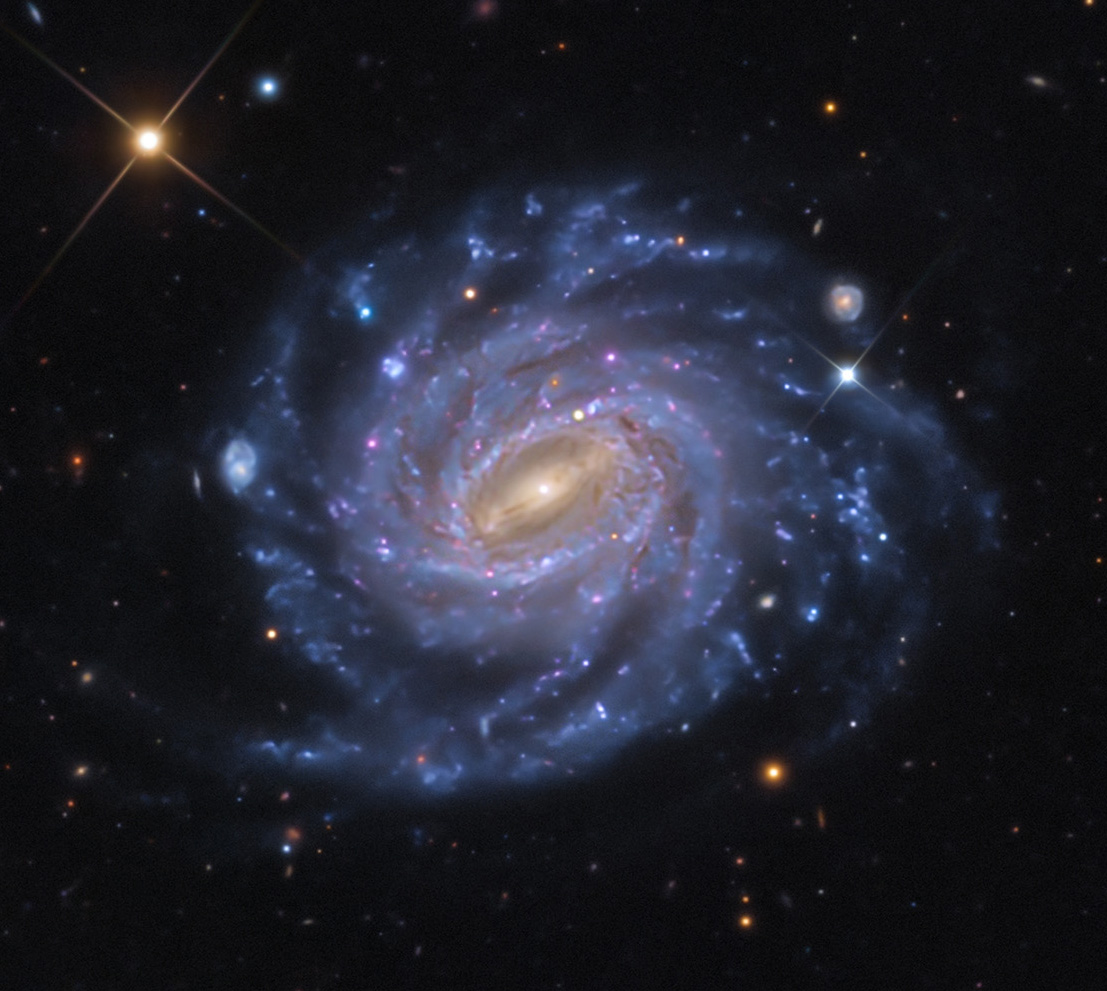
- NGC 3660 stacked for 52 hours in March 2026 with a (24") 0.6m telescope showing SN 2026cff at upper right of center

Observation data (J2000 epoch)
- Constellation: Crater
- Right ascension: 11^{h} 23^{m} 32.27^{s}
- Declination: −08° 39′ 30.62″
- Redshift: 0.012285
- Heliocentric radial velocity: 3,683 km/s ± 2
- Distance: 206 Mly (63.27 Mpc)
- Apparent magnitude (V): 12.2

Characteristics
- Type: SB(r)bc;HII Sy2
- Size: ~165,000 ly (50.7 kpc) (estimated)

Other designations
- 2MASX J11233229-0839308, 6dF J1123322-083931, CGS 367, PGC 34980, IRAS 11210-0823, MCG -01-29-016, MRK 1291, NSA 139324

NGC 3660 is a barred spiral galaxy located in the constellation of Crater. The redshift of the galaxy is (z) 0.012 (roughly 200 million light-years away) and it was first discovered in February 1787 by the German-British astronomer by the name of William Herschel who described it as a large faint object with an irregular appearance and a bright center. It is also an active Seyfert galaxy, specifically of Type 2.

== Description ==
NGC 3660 is described as a barred spiral galaxy of type SBbc with a measured optical magnitude of 11.9 in V-band. The galaxy is also depicted as isolated and it has a strong bar feature with a barely resolved ring based on K-band imaging. The bar feature is shown to be extending outwards until around 16 arcseconds at the position angle of 116°. A smooth structure is seen to be more redder when inching towards the central region with a redder bar region. Color mapping also showed there is a possibility of a small circumnuclear region.

The nucleus of the galaxy is active and it has been depicted to have a compact appearance. There are about 59 H II regions that are distributed around the ring feature and also along the direction of its spiral arms. On the outskirt regions, these regions are highly excited when compared to those located in the ring, especially in tow of the regions located in the direction of northeast by 40 and 50 arcseconds from its nucleus. Some faint regions are present to the southeast, forming a shell feature.

A weak hydrogen alpha component has been detected with a full width at half maximum (FWHM) of 1,950 kilometers per seconds. A study also found the galaxy is indeed variable when detected in both soft and hard X-rays. There are also molecular gas detections in the galaxy with the total mass estimated to be 0.80 × 10^{9} M_{☉} based on CO 1-0 observations.

== Supernovae ==
Three supernovae have been observed in NGC 3660:

- SN 2017byz (Type II, mag. 16.46) was discovered by ATLAS on 4 March 2017.
- SN 2018jlp (Type II, mag. 18.732) was discovered by ATLAS on 4 December 2018.
- SN 2026cff (Type II, mag. 17.0032) was discovered by the Automatic Learning for the Rapid Classification of Events (ALeRCE) on 6 February 2026.. This supernova (ZTF26aaffpvx) was part of the Unistellar "cosmic cataclysms" smart telescope tracking project.
