= HD 98088 =

Binary star in the constellation Crater

- Location of HD 98088 (circled in red)

Observation data Epoch J2000.0 Equinox ICRS
- Constellation: Crater
- Right ascension: 11^{h} 16^{m} 58.177^{s}
- Declination: –07° 08′ 04.870″
- Apparent magnitude (V): 6.11

Characteristics
- Spectral type: A8 Sr Cr Eu; A3Vp + A8V
- B−V color index: 0.211±0.008
- Variable type: α^{2} CVn

Astrometry
Radial velocity (R_{v})	−8.65±0.29 km/s
Proper motion (μ)	RA: −8.221 mas/yr Dec.: +8.458 mas/yr
Parallax (π)	7.88±0.0566 mas
Distance	414 ± 3 ly (126.9 ± 0.9 pc)
Absolute magnitude (M_{V})	0.56

Orbit
Period (P)	5.9051102±0.0000023 d
Eccentricity (e)	0.1840±0.0025
Inclination (i)	69±2°
Periastron epoch (T)	2434401.369±0.015 JD
Semi-amplitude (K_{1}) (primary)	73.31±0.26 km/s
Semi-amplitude (K_{2}) (secondary)	100.70±0.43 km/s

Details

Primary
Mass	2.19±0.07 M_{☉}
Radius	2.76±0.28 R_{☉}
Luminosity	32.4^{+4.8}_{−4.2} L_{☉}
Surface gravity (log g)	3.90±0.09 cgs
Temperature	8,030±120 K
Age	646^{+96}_{−83} Myr

Secondary
Mass	1.67±0.08 M_{☉}
Radius	1.77±0.24 R_{☉}
Luminosity	8.9^{+2.3}_{−1.8} L_{☉}
Surface gravity (log g)	4.16±0.12 cgs
Temperature	7,500±300 K

Other designations
- SV Crt, BD−06°3344, FK5 2900, GC 15514, HD 98088, HIP 55106, HR 4369, SAO 138106, PPM 194312, WDS J11170-0708A

Database references
SIMBAD	data

HD 98088 is a close binary star system of chemically peculiar stars in the southern constellation of Crater. It has the variable star designation SV Crt and is sometimes called "Abt's star" after Helmut Abt. With an apparent visual magnitude that varies around 6.11, it is faintly visible to the naked eye. Based on parallax measurements, it is located at a distance of 414 light-years (126.9 pc).

== Observations ==
In 1950, as part of a survey of 2,111 stars, Ralph E. Wilson and Alfred H. Joy found a radial velocity of −55 km/s and a stellar classification of gFop for HD 98088. They noted that one of their spectroscopic plates showed double lines, and a line of ionized strontium appeared abnormally strong.

Helmut A. Abt took an interest in this star and decided to investigate. He found a variation in the radial velocity with a period of 5.905±0.005 d, suggesting this is a binary system. In 1958, Horace W. Babcock identified it as a short period spectroscopic binary with a magnetic field. He found a class of A2p with anomalous line intensities for strontium, barium, and titanium. The magnetic field varied in intensity in a manner which resembled that in α^{2} Canum Venaticorum.

In 1968, Abt and associates determined that the Ap component of this double-lined spectroscopic binary is a main sequence star with about 2.2 times the mass of the Sun. Its companion is fainter by 1.2 magnitudes, suggesting a spectral type of A8V. The rotation of the primary appears aligned with its orbital period so that one side constantly faces its companion. The system is not eclipsing, but the orbit is inclined at an angle of about 67° to the plane of the sky. In 1973, H. M. Maitzen demonstrated the system varied regularly in visual light, with the primary minimum occurring when the lines of strontium and europium were at maximum strength.

In 2002, F. Carrier and associates published revised orbital elements based on CORAVEL velocimeter measurements. These were consistent with the earlier elements by Abt. Of interest is that the system shows a significant orbital eccentricity despite the close orbit. This suggested that apsidal motion should occur, but observations indicates the period must be a millennium or longer. Abundance analysis of the system in 2013 showed that the secondary component is an Am star. This makes it a rare example of a tidally locked binary system in which both components are chemically peculiar, and one is an Ap star.

The system has a pair of visual companions.
