= S Crateris =

Semiregular variable star in the constellation Crater

Observation data Epoch J2000 Equinox ICRS
- Constellation: Crater
- Right ascension: 11^{h} 52^{m} 45.098^{s}
- Declination: −07° 35′ 48.08″
- Apparent magnitude (V): 8.64 - 9.51

Characteristics
- Evolutionary stage: AGB
- Spectral type: M6e–M7e
- B−V color index: 1.078
- Variable type: SRb

Astrometry
Radial velocity (R_{v})	43.55 km/s
Proper motion (μ)	RA: −3.52 mas/yr Dec.: −5.08 mas/yr
Parallax (π)	2.33±0.13 mas
Distance	430 pc

Details
Radius	260 R_{☉}
Luminosity	5970 L_{☉}
Temperature	3097 K

Other designations
- HD 103154, HIP 57917, SAO 138457, AFGL 4830S, IRAS 11501−0719, IRC −10259, 2MASS J11524508−0735482

Database references
SIMBAD	data

S Crateris (also designated S Crt) is a semiregular variable star of subtype SRb located in the constellation Crater. It is an asymptotic giant branch (AGB) star with a spectral type of M6e-M7e. The star was discovered to vary in brightness by Williamina Fleming in 1906.

== Observation ==
S Crateris is situated at right ascension 11^{h} 52^{m} 45.098^{s}, declination −07° 35′ 48.08″ (J2000.0). Its apparent magnitude in the V band varies between approximately 8.64 and 9.51, giving an amplitude of about 0.87 mag. In the infrared, the star is considerably brighter: the 2MASS catalog lists magnitudes of J = 2.055, H = 1.127, and K = 0.786.

== Variability ==
S Crateris is classified as a semiregular variable of type SRb in both the General Catalogue of Variable Stars and the AAVSO Variable Star Index. Its pulsation period is 155 days. The optical light curve in the V band exhibits a variation of approximately 0.8 magnitudes. The reference epoch is HJD 2452284.2 (9 January 2002).

== Distance ==
The distance to S Crateris has been the subject of several independent measurements that yielded notably inconsistent results prior to modern VLBI observations. Early estimates based on the period–luminosity relation of Mira variables placed the star at distances of 285 and 420 pc. The original Hipparcos Catalogue measured a parallax of 2.04±1.31 mas, corresponding to a distance of approximately 490 pc, but with a large uncertainty. The revised Hipparcos reduction by van Leeuwen (2007) yielded a parallax of 1.26±0.92 mas, corresponding to a distance of roughly 794 pc.

== Proper motion ==
The absolute proper motion of S Crateris, derived from VERA observations after subtracting the internal motion of the reference maser spot, is (μ_{α}, μ_{δ}) = (−3.17±0.22, −5.41±0.22 mas/yr. This is consistent with the value reported in the revised Hipparcos catalog of (−3.37±1.00, −4.68±0.75) mas/yr. The SIMBAD database lists proper motion values of −3.520 and −5.084 mas/yr from the Gaia-based catalog. The heliocentric radial velocity is 43.55 km/s.

== Water masers and circumstellar outflow ==
S Crateris hosts a water maser source at 22 GHz. The stellar systemic LSR velocity is 37.85 km s^{−1}.

VERA observations conducted from October 2005 to May 2007 detected internal motions of 26 individual maser spots, with a typical transverse speed of 5.56 km s^{−1}. Analysis of the three-dimensional velocity field revealed a bipolar outflow with its major axis oriented along the northeast–southwest direction, at a position angle of approximately 255°. The outflow axis is inclined at approximately 43° to the plane of the sky, with the southwestern lobe directed away from the observer. The projected maser distribution radius of 14.2 ± 3.5 mas corresponds to a linear radius of 8.96 AU at the adopted distance of 430 pc.

The maser flux at 34.7 km s^{−1} underwent a radio flare beginning in February 2006, reaching a peak of 371 Jy on 31 March 2006, before declining to approximately 60 Jy by July 2006.
