= Abell 1146 =

Galaxy cluster in the constellation Crater

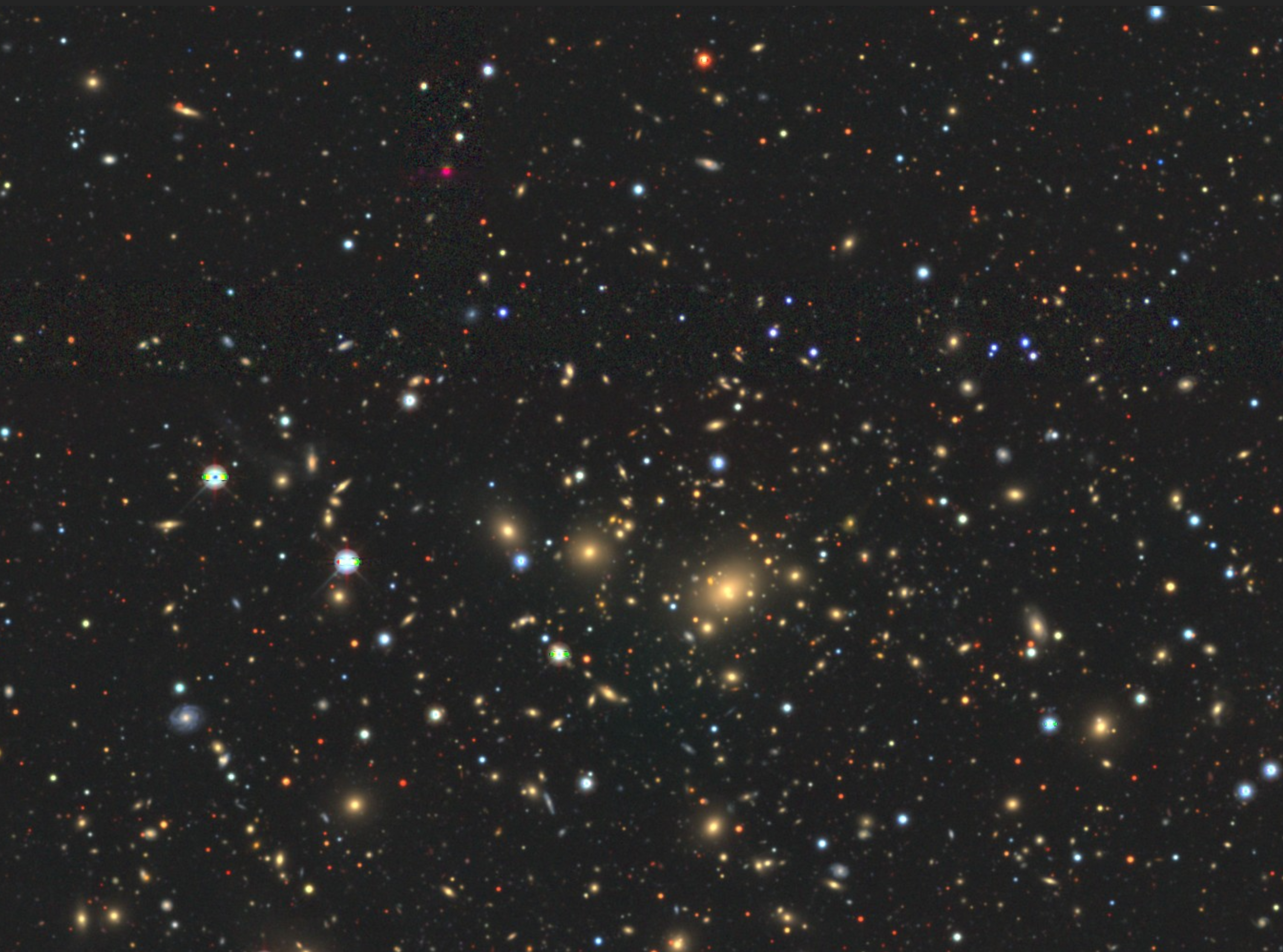
- Abell 1146 seen by DESI Legacy Surveys DR11

Observation data (Epoch J2000)
- Constellation: Crater
- Right ascension: 11^{h} 01^{m} 20.6^{s}
- Declination: −22° 43′ 08″
- Brightest member: PGC 33231
- Richness class: 4
- Bautz–Morgan classification: I
- Velocity dispersion: 1020
- Redshift: 0.142
- Distance: 2,059.3 ± 144.2 Mly (631.38 ± 44.20 Mpc)
- X-ray luminosity: 6.61×10^{44}

Other designations
- 2E 2375, RX J1101.3-2243

Abell 1146 is a rich galaxy cluster in the constellation Crater. Its richness class is 4, and it is located about 2 billion light-years (630 megaparsecs) away.

Its brightest member, PGC 33231, is an elliptical galaxy. It has a redshift of 0.142.
