= HD 96167 b =

Extrasolar planet orbiting the star HD 96167

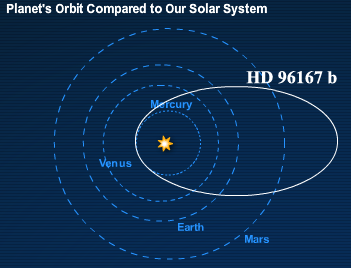
- HD 96167 b's orbit compared to the orbit of Mars (1.5AU) in the Solar System. This eccentric Jupiter has a comet-like orbit.

Discovery
- Discovered by: Peek et al.
- Discovery site: Lick and Keck Observatories
- Discovery date: April 17, 2009
- Detection method: radial velocity

Orbital characteristics
- Semi-major axis: 1.332±0.092 AU
- Eccentricity: 0.681±0.033
- Orbital period (sidereal): 498.1±0.81 d
- Time of periastron: 2463060.3±4.5
- Argument of periastron: 288.3±6.4
- Semi-amplitude: 21.1±1.6
- Star: HD 96167

HD 96167 b is a confirmed extrasolar planet located approximately 280 light years away in the constellation of Crater, orbiting the 8th magnitude G-type subgiant HD 96167. It is a Jupiter-type planet with an extremely elliptical orbit, coming as close as 0.4 AU to its star, and as much as 2.2 AU out. Thus, in the inner orbit the planet is as close to the star as Mercury is to the Sun, yet in the outer orbit the planet mostly resides in the habitable zone. Its mass is that of 0.717 Jupiters, and an unknown radius, yet an approximation is that of 1.25 Jupiters. These values are not certain, as the planet has not been measured by a transit observation. The planet was discovered on April 17, 2009. Not to be confused with the exoplanet HD 96167 b, the HD 96167 B is a close by stellar companion.
