= Crater 2 Dwarf =

Dwarf satellite galaxy of the Milky Way

Crater 2

Observation data (J2000.0 epoch)
- Constellation: Crater
- Right ascension: 11^{h} 49^{m} 14.400^{s} 177.310°±0.03°
- Declination: −18° 24′ 46.80″ −18.413°±0.03°
- Heliocentric radial velocity: 88 km/s
- Galactocentric velocity: −74 km/s
- Distance: 383,000 ly (117.5 kpc)
- Apparent magnitude (V): 12.15 mag
- Absolute magnitude (V): −8.2±0.1 mag

Characteristics
- Type: dSph
- Apparent size (V): 62.4′ (rh=31.2′ ± 2.5′); 6,950 ly (2,132 pc) rh=1066pc ± 84pc
- Notable features: 4th largest satellite galaxy to Milky Way

Crater 2 is a low-surface-brightness dwarf satellite galaxy of the Milky Way, located approximately 380,000 ly from Earth. Its discovery in 2016 revealed significant gaps in astronomers' understanding of galaxies possessing relatively small half-light diameters and suggested the possibility of many undiscovered dwarf galaxies orbiting the Milky Way. Crater 2 was identified in imaging data from the VST ATLAS survey.

The galaxy has a half-light radius of ~1100 pc, making it the fourth largest satellite of the Milky Way. It has an angular size about double of that of the moon. Despite the large size, Crater 2 has a surprisingly low surface brightness, implying that it is not very massive. In addition, its velocity dispersion is also low, suggesting it may have formed in a halo of low dark matter density. Alternatively, it may be a result of tidal interactions with it and larger galaxies, such as the Milky Way and the Large Magellanic Cloud, but according to some simulations, this would not explain the relatively large size. This unusually low velocity dispersion was predicted using Modified Newtonian Dynamics, an alternative to the dark matter hypothesis. This prediction was later confirmed by observations.

== See also ==
- Antlia 2
- Satellite galaxies of the Milky Way
- Local Group
