= BD−10°3166 b =

Extrasolar planet in the constellation Crater

Discovery
- Discovered by: Butler, Vogt, Marcy et al.
- Discovery site: California, United States
- Discovery date: 22 April 2000
- Detection method: Radial velocity

Orbital characteristics
- Semi-major axis: 0.0452 ± 0.0026 AU (6,760,000 ± 390,000 km)
- Eccentricity: 0.019 ± 0.023
- Orbital period (sidereal): 3.48777 ± 0.00011 d
- Time of periastron: 2,451,171.22 ± 0.69
- Argument of periastron: 334
- Semi-amplitude: 60.9 ± 1.4
- Star: BD−10°3166

BD−10°3166 b is an extrasolar planet approximately 268 light-years away in the constellation of Crater. This planet is a so-called "Hot Jupiter", a planet that orbits its parent star in a very close orbit. Distance to the star is less than 1/20th Earth's distance from the Sun. No transits by the planet have been detected, so the planet's orbital plane cannot be exactly aligned with our direction of view.
