= SZ Crateris =

Star in the constellation Crater

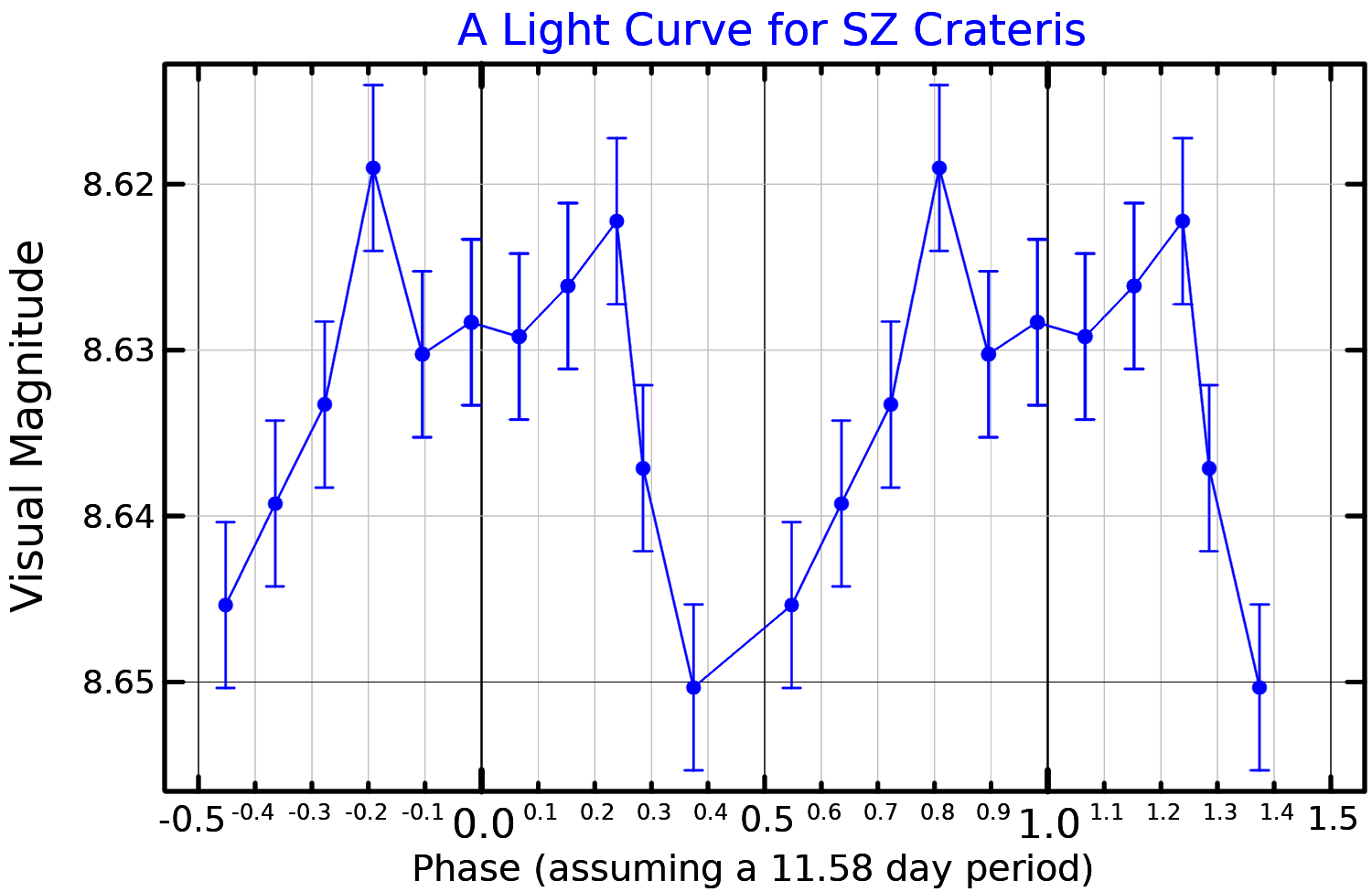
- A visual band light curve for SZ Crateris, adapted from Cutispoto et al. (2001)

Observation data Epoch J2000 Equinox ICRS
- Constellation: Crater
- A
- Right ascension: 11^{h} 21^{m} 26.6594^{s}
- Declination: −20° 27′ 13.790″
- Apparent magnitude (V): 8.61
- B
- Right ascension: 11^{h} 21^{m} 26.5883^{s}
- Declination: −20° 27′ 09.394″
- Apparent magnitude (V): 11.0

Characteristics
- Spectral type: K7V/M2.5Ve
- U−B color index: +1.20
- B−V color index: +1.36
- Variable type: BY Dra

Astrometry

A
Radial velocity (R_{v})	−0.11 km/s
Proper motion (μ)	RA: +181.231 mas/yr Dec.: −92.306 mas/yr
Parallax (π)	76.4165±0.0821 mas
Distance	42.68 ± 0.05 ly (13.09 ± 0.01 pc)
Absolute magnitude (M_{V})	+7.75

B
Radial velocity (R_{v})	−2.86 km/s
Proper motion (μ)	RA: +220.306 mas/yr Dec.: −129.404 mas/yr
Parallax (π)	76.3549±0.0955 mas
Distance	42.72 ± 0.05 ly (13.10 ± 0.02 pc)
Absolute magnitude (M_{V})	+10.0

Orbit
Period (P)	714.6 yr
Semi-major axis (a)	5.896″
Eccentricity (e)	0.63

Details

A
Radius	0.63 R_{☉}
Luminosity	0.109 L_{☉}
Surface gravity (log g)	4.5 cgs
Temperature	4,162 K
Metallicity [Fe/H]	0.04 dex
Rotational velocity (v sin i)	4.5 km/s

B
Radius	0.593 (Note: Applying the Stefan–Boltzmann law with a nominal solar effective temperature of 5,772 K: $$\sqrt{(5772/3670)^4 * 0.0575} = 0.593\ R\odot$$) R_{☉}
Luminosity	0.0575 (Note: Calculating using the equation 10^{0.4 • (4.74−M_{bol})}, where M_{bol} is the absolute bolometric magnitude.) L_{☉}
Temperature	3,670 K
Age	194±20 Myr

Other designations
- SZ Crt, BD−19 3242, GJ 425, HD 98712, SAO 179801, HIP 55454
- A: LTT 4204
- B: LTT 4205

Database references
SIMBAD	data
- A
- B

SZ Crateris is a binary star system in the southern constellation Crater. Both components belong to the main sequence: the primary star has a spectral classification of K5V while the secondary is a red dwarf of spectral class M0V. The radius of the primary is about 66% the radius of the Sun, while the secondary member is only about 42% of the solar radius. In 1994, the two stars were separated by 5.1 arc seconds, which is equivalent to 112.41 astronomical units.

SZ Crateris was discovered to be variable in 1985 and is classified as a marginal BY Draconis variable, with an optical variability cycle of 11.58 days. The star causing the variability is unspecified and the total brightness change is less than 0.1 magnitudes, but the faintness of the secondary makes it likely that the primary star is the one varying in brightness. Compared to the Sun, SZ Crateris has a slightly higher proportion of elements other than hydrogen and helium. Based upon gyrochronology, the estimated age of this star is under 200 million years.

The SZ Crateris system is a member of the Ursa Major moving group of stars that have similar motions through space. The space velocity components of this system are U = +13.86±0.37, V = −3.51±1.97 and W = +1.65±1.53 km/s. It is on an orbit through the Milky Way that has an orbital eccentricity of 0.092, which will bring it as close as 26.06 kly (7.99 kpc) to the galactic core, and as distant as 31.31 kly (9.60 kpc). The inclination of the orbit carries the system as much as 0.352 kly (0.108 kpc) from the plane of the galactic disk.
