= NGC 3672 =

Galaxy in the constellation Crater

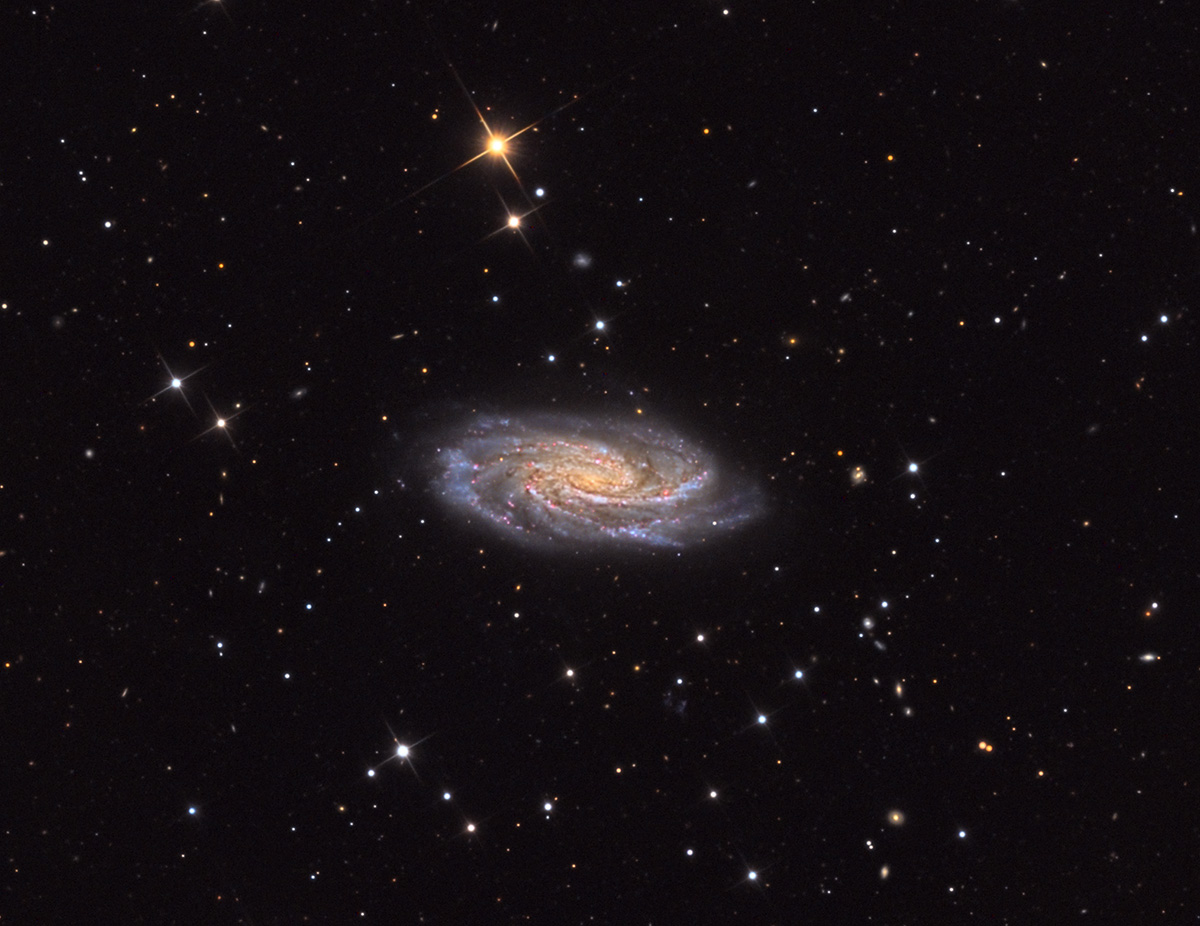
- NGC 3672 imaged by the Schulman 0.8m Telescope at Mount Lemmon Observatory

Observation data (J2000 epoch)
- Constellation: Crater
- Right ascension: 11^{h} 25^{m} 02.4755^{s}
- Declination: −09° 47′ 42.905″
- Redshift: 0.006241 ± 0.000002
- Heliocentric radial velocity: 1,871 ± 1 km/s
- Distance: 80.4 ± 15.3 Mly (24.6 ± 4.7 Mpc)
- Group or cluster: NGC 3672 Group
- Apparent magnitude (V): 11.4

Characteristics
- Type: SA(s)c
- Size: ~100,000 ly (30.6 kpc) (estimated)
- Apparent size (V): 4.2′ × 1.9′

Other designations
- IRAS 11225-0931, UGCA 235, MCG -02-29-028, PGC 35088

NGC 3672 is an unbarred spiral galaxy in the constellation Crater. The galaxy lies about 80 million light years away from Earth, which means, given its apparent dimensions, that NGC 3672 is approximately 100,000 light years across. It was discovered by William Herschel on March 4, 1786.

== Characteristics ==
The galaxy has a small, bright nucleus. Its mass is estimated to be about 200 million solar masses and its radius 350 parsecs (1,100 ly). Spectral analysis of the nuclear region of the galaxy revealed the presence of large velocity gradients along the minor axis of the outer disk. This has been interpreted as a result of the presence of excited nuclear gas rotating at a large angle with respect to the rest of the galaxy or gas clouds collapsing towards the centre. That was the first time such nuclear gas kinematics were observed in a spiral galaxy. Four well defined arms with many knots emerge from the centre of the galaxy in a grand design pattern. The star formation rate of the galaxy is estimated to be about 3.5 M_{☉} per year.

== Supernovae ==
Two supernovae have been observed in NGC 3672:

- SN 2007bm was discovered by R. Martin of the Perth Observatory in images taken by the Perth Automated Supernova Search on 20 and 21 April 2007 at an apparent magnitude of 16 about 2".4 west and 10".8 south of center of the galaxy. It was identified as a Type Ia supernova about a week before maximum. It reached a peak magnitude of 14.2.
- SN 2008gz was discovered by Kōichi Itagaki on 5 November 2008 at an apparent magnitude of 16.2 located 13" east and 7" south of the center of NGC 3672. It was identified as a Type IIP supernova about 80 days past explosion. The supernova took place at the inner parts of a spiral arm, next to an HII region. The progenitor star was estimated to have had a mass of 17 M_{☉} while it was in the main sequence.

== Nearby galaxies ==
NGC 3672 is the foremost member of the NGC 3672 Group, also known as LGG 235. Other members of the group include NGC 3636, NGC 3637, and IC 688. IC 688 lies about 20 arcminutes away from NGC 3672. The galaxy group lies in the same galaxy cloud with NGC 3730 and NGC 3779.

== Gallery ==
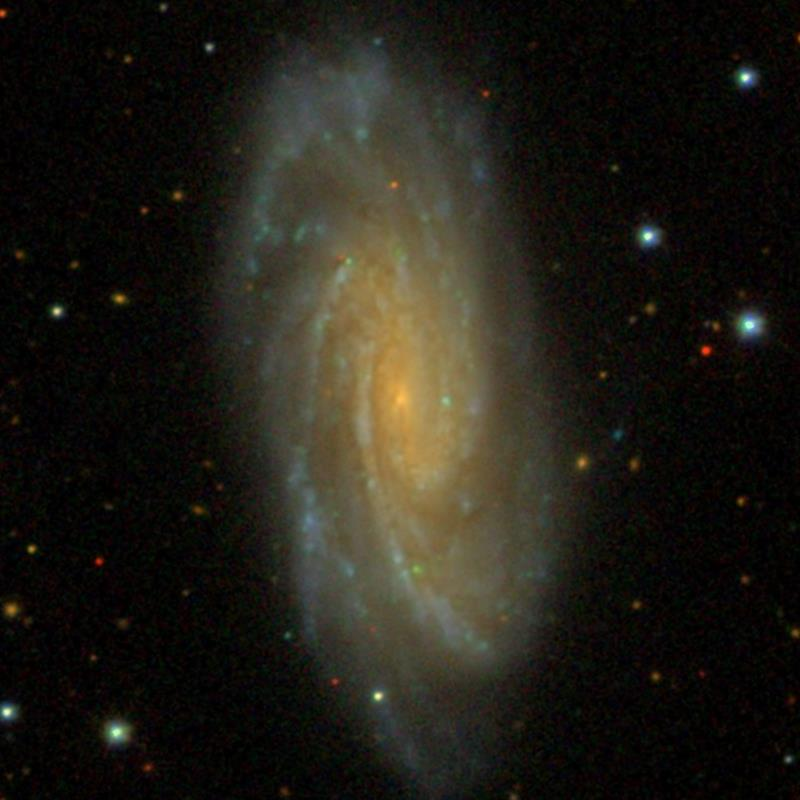
NGC 3672 by the Sloan Digital Sky Survey
