= R Crateris =

Variable star in the constellation Crater

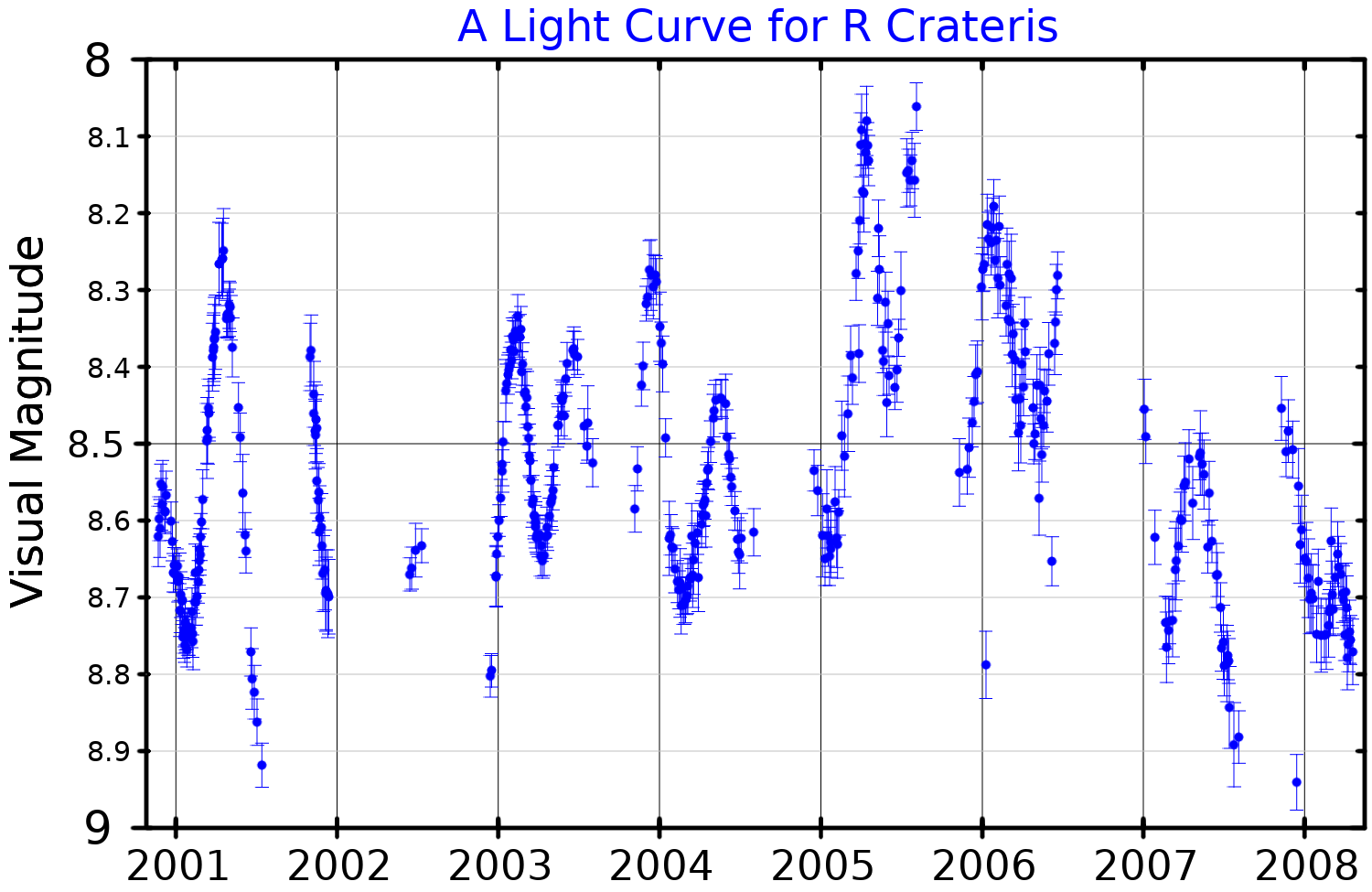
- A visual band light curve for R Crateris, plotted from ASAS data.

Observation data Epoch J2000 Equinox ICRS
- Constellation: Crater
- Right ascension: 11^{h} 00^{m} 33.85257^{s}
- Declination: −18° 19′ 29.5827″
- Apparent magnitude (V): 8.1 - 9.5

Characteristics
- Evolutionary stage: AGB
- Spectral type: M7/8III
- Variable type: SRb

Astrometry
Radial velocity (R_{v})	20.94±1.50 km/s
Proper motion (μ)	RA: −29.373±0.180 mas/yr Dec.: −2.499±0.172 mas/yr
Parallax (π)	4.7027±0.1528 mas
Distance	690 ± 20 ly (213 ± 7 pc)

Details
Mass	1.91 M_{☉}
Radius	633 R_{☉}
Luminosity	8,151 L_{☉}
Surface gravity (log g)	−0.86 cgs
Temperature	3,295 K

Other designations
- HD 95384, HIP 53809, SAO 156389, IRC −20222, RAFGL 1450

Database references
SIMBAD	data

R Crateris is a star about 700 light years from the Earth in the constellation Crater. It is a semiregular variable star, ranging in brightness from magnitude 8.1 to 9.5 over a period of about 160 days. It is not visible to the naked-eye, but can be seen with a small telescope, or binoculars. R Crateris is a double star; the variable star and its magnitude 9.9 F8V companion are separated by 65.4 arcseconds.

Friedrich August Theodor Winnecke discovered that the star is variable in 1861. In 1907 it appeared with its variable star designation, R Crateris, in Annie Jump Cannon's Second Catalog of Variable Stars. Although the period for large brightness changes in R Crateris is listed as ~160 days, in 1982 Silvia Livi and Thaisa Bergmann reported small (~0.1 magnitude) variations on timescales of less than one hour. The rapid variations seem to be more regular when the star is near maximum brightness.

R Crateris is an oxygen-rich asymptotic giant branch star, losing mass at a rate of 8×10^{−7} solar masses per year via a stellar wind. At large distances from the star, the wind is expanding into space at 11.7±0.3 km/s.

Near-infrared radiation from R Crateris was detected in the first Two-Micron Sky Survey, published in 1969. It was detected in the far-infrared by the IRAS satellite, and that emission was resolved by IRAS, showing that the star is surrounded by a large circumstellar shell containing dust. High resolution far-infrared images of R Crateris taken by the Herschel Space Observatory show that the emitting region of the shell, roughly 280 arcseconds (0.94 light year) across, consists primarily of two non-concentric arcs well separated from the star itself. The arcs are probably bowshocks formed as the dusty stellar wind collides with the interstellar medium. The total mass of the shell, including both dust and gas, is estimated to be about (6.4±2)×10^{−2} solar masses. Infrared imaging of the innermost (sub-arcsecond) portion of the dust shell shows a bipolar structure.

In the early 1970s, maser emission from OH and H_{2}O was detected in R Crateris' circumstellar shell. SiO maser emission was detected in 1985. Thermal (non-maser) emission from CO was detected in 1986.

With the high angular resolution provided by Very Long Baseline Interferometry, the H_{2}O maser emission is seen to arise from small (milli-arcsecond) blobs, whose proper motions through the inner region of the circumstellar shell can be measured. These observations give additional evidence that R Crateris has developed a bipolar stellar wind.
