= NGC 3887 =

Galaxy in the constellation Crater

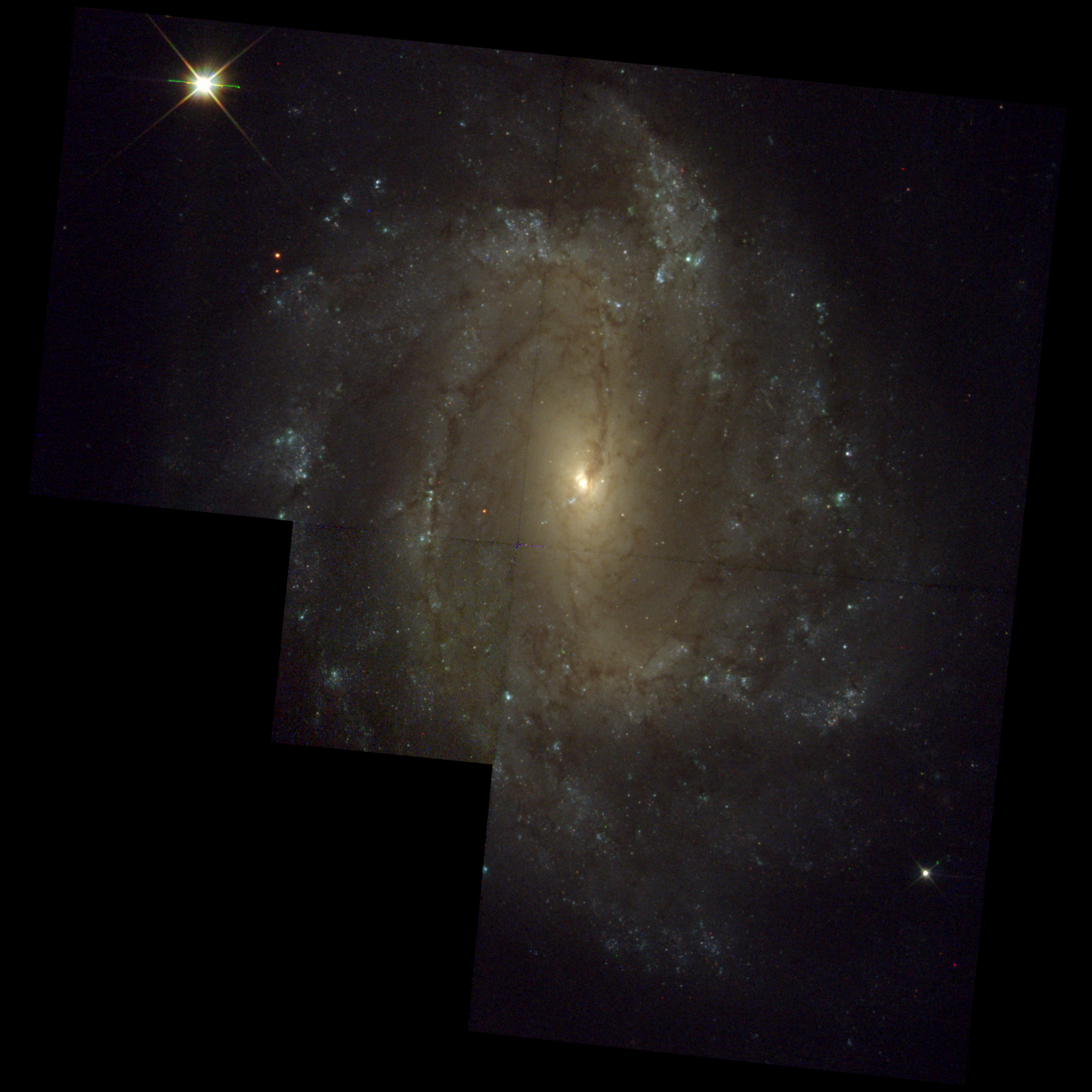
- NGC 3887 imaged by Hubble Space Telescope

Observation data (J2000 epoch)
- Constellation: Crater
- Right ascension: 11^{h} 47^{m} 04.5920^{s}
- Declination: −16° 51′ 16.210″
- Redshift: 0.004029 ± 0.000004
- Heliocentric radial velocity: 1,208 ± 1 km/s
- Distance: 57.7 ± 5.9 Mly (17.7 ± 1.8 Mpc)
- Apparent magnitude (V): 10.6

Characteristics
- Type: SB(r)bc
- Size: ~61,000 ly (18.6 kpc) (estimated)
- Apparent size (V): 3.3′ × 2.5′

Other designations
- IRAS 11445-1634, UGCA 246, MCG -03-30-012, PGC 36754

NGC 3887 is a barred spiral galaxy in the constellation Crater. The galaxy lies about 55 million light years away from Earth, which means, given its apparent dimensions, that NGC 3887 is approximately 60,000 light years across. It was discovered by William Herschel on December 31, 1785.

NGC 3887 is a barred galaxy. Two thin dust lanes run across the bar from the centre of the galaxy, which bend and extend into the arms. The bar is embedded in a small centrally concentrated bulge. The galaxy has two spiral arms which emerge from its end of the bar. The arms appear lumpy and can be traced for about 300° before fading. The lumps are the most pronounced part of the arms at their outer portion. HII regions are visible across the arms. The star formation rate is estimated to be 2.1 M_{☉} per year. The galaxy has an inner ring, with a diameter of 1.13 arcminutes and an outer ring with a diameter of 3.38 arcminutes. In the centre of the galaxy lies a supermassive black hole with an estimated mass of (2.82±1.33)×10^{6} M_{☉}. The galaxy is seen at an inclination of 49°.

NGC 3887 is the foremost galaxy of the NGC 3887 Group, which also includes the galaxies HIPASS J1143-15, [KKS2000] 25, and HIPASS J1150-17.

== Gallery ==
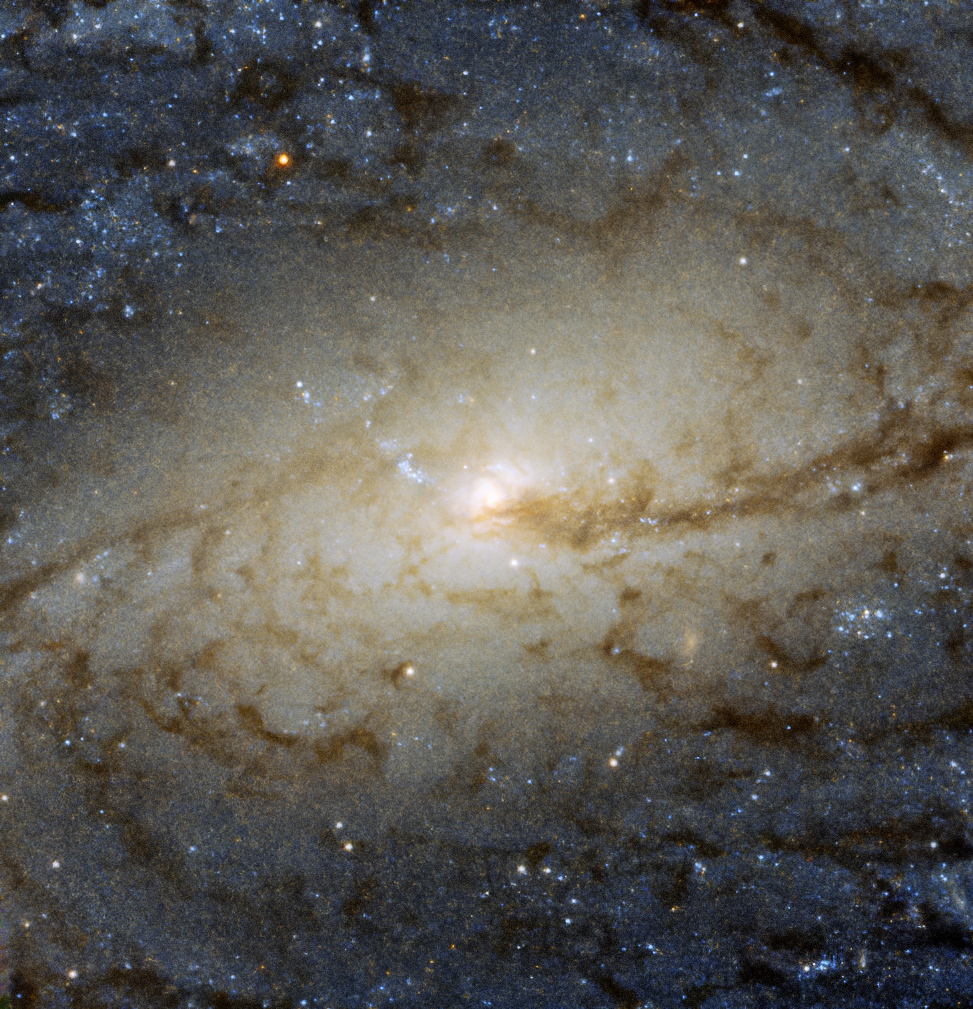
The central region of NGC 3887 by the Hubble Space Telescope

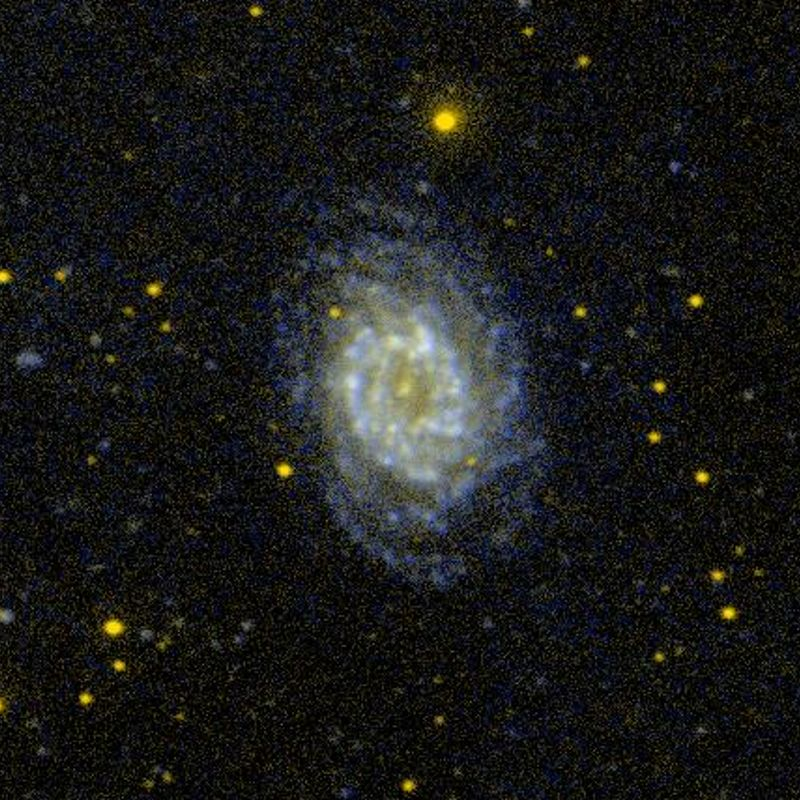
NGC 3887 in ultraviolet by GALEX
