= HD 96167 =

Star in the constellation Crater

Observation data Epoch J2000.0 Equinox ICRS
- Constellation: Crater
- Right ascension: 11^{h} 05^{m} 15.0688^{s}
- Declination: −10° 17′ 28.6947″
- Apparent magnitude (V): 8.09

Characteristics
- Spectral type: G5V + M4
- B−V color index: 0.731±0.017
- Variable type: none

Astrometry
Radial velocity (R_{v})	+12.05±0.19 km/s
Proper motion (μ)	RA: −50.494±0.081 mas/yr Dec.: −9.496±0.072 mas/yr
Parallax (π)	11.6947±0.0565 mas
Distance	279 ± 1 ly (85.5 ± 0.4 pc)
Absolute magnitude (M_{V})	3.41

Position (relative to HD 96167 A)
Component	HD 96167 B
Epoch of observation	2013
Angular distance	5.873±0.018″
Position angle	297.06±0.10°
Projected separation	506 AU

Details

HD 96167 A
Mass	1.16±0.05 M_{☉}
Radius	1.73±0.18 R_{☉}
Luminosity	3.39+1.18 −0.88 L_{☉}
Surface gravity (log g)	4.15±0.06 cgs
Temperature	5,749±25 K
Metallicity [Fe/H]	0.35±0.05 dex
Rotational velocity (v sin i)	1.03±0.36 km/s
Age	5.62±0.83 Gyr

HD 96167 B
Mass	0.23 M_{☉}

Other designations
- BD−09°3201, HD 96167, HIP 54195, SAO 156444, PPM 223905, WDS 11053-1017, 2MASS J11051506-1017286, Gaia DR2 3758718711877270784

Database references
SIMBAD	data
Exoplanet Archive	data

HD 96167 is a double star system with an exoplanetary companion in the southern constellation of Crater. The apparent visual magnitude of this system is 8.09, which is too faint to be readily visible to the naked eye. It is located at a distance of approximately 279 light years from the Sun based on parallax, and is drifting further away with a radial velocity of +12 km/s.

The primary component, designated HD 96167 A, is an ordinary G-type main-sequence star with a stellar classification of G5V. It has also been classified as a subgiant star, suggesting it is somewhat more evolved having exhausted the hydrogen at its core. The star has an absolute magnitude of 3.41, placing it about a magnitude above the main sequence. It is metal rich and is around six billion years old. This star is larger, brighter and more massive than the Sun.

A faint co-moving stellar companion, component HD 96167 B, was detected in 2014 at a projected separation 506 AU from the primary. The existence of additional stellar companions was ruled out at projected distances from 51 to 740 astronomical units.

In 2009 it was found that primary star HD 96167 A is orbited by a Jovian planet on an eccentric orbit.

The HD 96167 planetary system
Companion (in order from star)	Mass	Semimajor axis (AU)	Orbital period (days)	Eccentricity	Inclination (°)	Radius
b	≥0.71±0.18 M_{J}	1.332±0.092	498.1±0.81	0.681±0.033	—	—

== See also ==
- List of extrasolar planets
