= Hans Michael Maitzen =

Austrian astronomer (1943–2026)

Hans Michael Maitzen (28 March 1943 – 14 July 2026) was an Austrian astronomer.

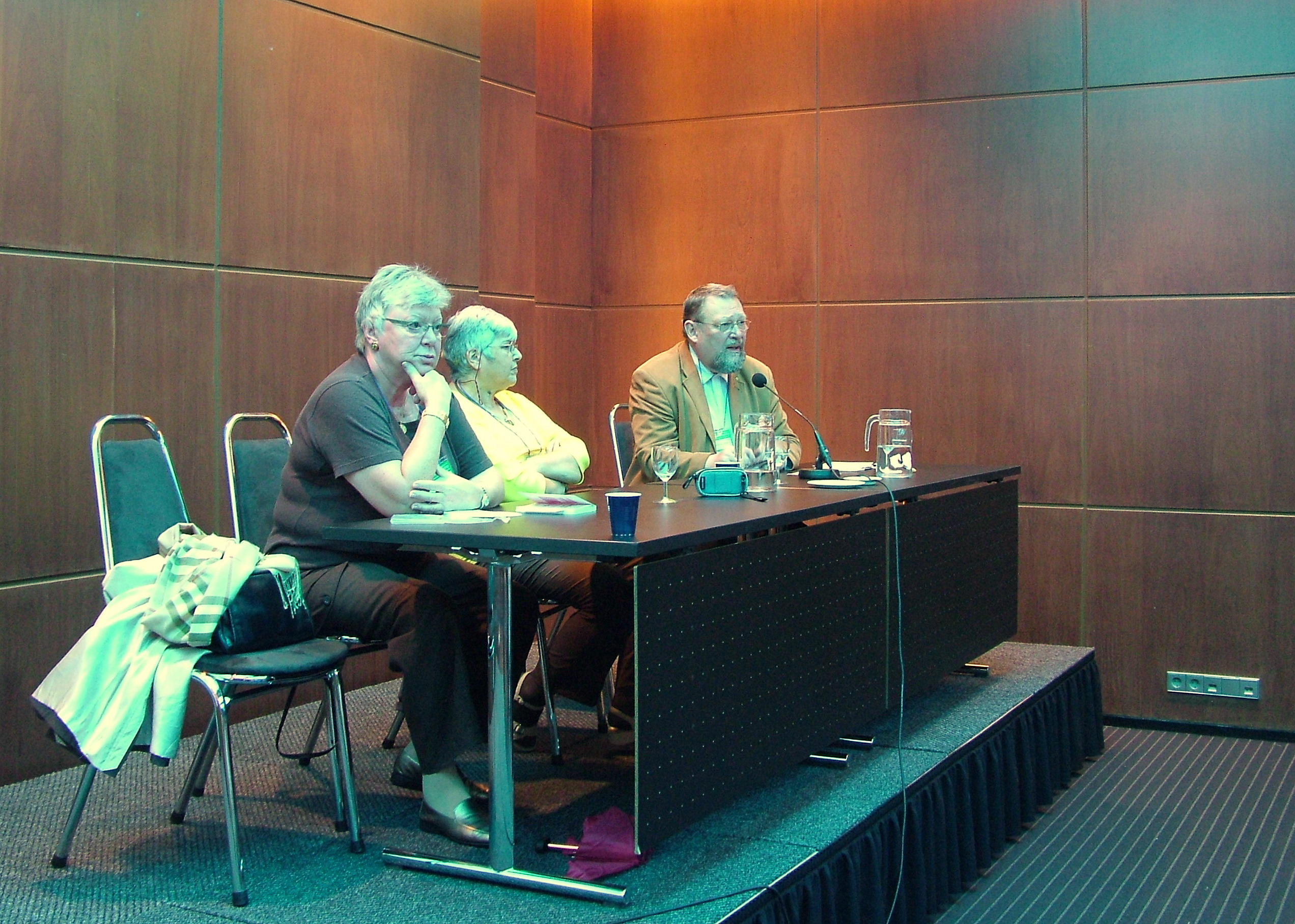
Maitzen (right) at Rotterdam 2008

== Life and career ==
Hans Michael Maitzen was born in Graz on 28 March 1943. After elementary (1949–1953) and secondary school attendance (1953–1961) in Graz, he began studying astronomy, mathematics and physics at the University of Graz in 1961, completing a PhD in astronomy in July 1967. During the last three years of his studies he was also a scientific assistant at the Institute for Astronomy at the University of Graz. Thereafter he was a scientific assistant at the Institute of Astronomy of the University of Bochum from 1969 until 1976. From then until 1985 he was scientific assistant in the Institute of Astronomy at the University of Vienna. In March 1980, Maitzen received his Doctor habilitatus there in astronomy. From 1985 he was a scientific advisor at the institute. The author of more than 200 scientific publications, from 1986 he represented the Austrian astronomical community in its relations with the European Southern Observatory (ESO). In March 1989, Kurt Waldheim, the federal president of Austria, granted him the title Außerordentlicher Professor.

Maitzen developed a filter-photometric tool for discovering chemically peculiar magnetic stars, which detects a distinctive flux depression in the radiation of these stars around the 520-nanometre wavelength.

== Personal life and death ==
Maitzen was married and had four children. He died on 14 July 2026, at the age of 83.

== Esperanto activities ==
Maitzen was a professor of the International Academy of Sciences San Marino, known by its Esperanto initials as AIS, and contributed to many of its study sessions. For several years he served as a member of the AIS Academic Senate; from 2012 to 2015 he served as the Academy's president.

Maitzen was an active Esperantist. From 1968 to 1969 he was president of the World Esperanto Youth Organization. Several times he helped organize contributions to the Internacia Kongresa Universitato, which offers specialized lecture programs coinciding with the annual World Congress of Esperanto of the UEA. He collaborated on astronomical terminology for the second edition of Plena Ilustrita Vortaro de Esperanto, a very extensive monolingual Esperanto dictionary often abbreviated as PIV.

In Vienna he made significant contributions to Esperanto life and culture through a 1987 international scientific symposium for the 100th anniversary of the Esperanto language and with a 2001 seminar on the occasion of the European Year of Languages. Maitzen was the chief representative of the Universal Esperanto Association (UEA) to the United Nations Office at Vienna (UNOV).

== Selected publications ==
- Pri la astronomio – koncize ("Concerning astronomy, concisely", Esperanto), with Géza Felső, in Sciencaj Komunikaĵoj, SEC Budapest, No. 9, 55, 1985.
- La reprezentiĝo de faka terminologio en enciklopedioj, demonstre de astronomio en Plena Ilustrita Vortaro ("The representation of subject-matter terminology en encyclopædias, demonstrated for astronomy in Plena Ilustrita Vortaro", Esperanto) in Modernaj rimedoj de komunikado, KAEST 1998 Prague, KAVA-Pech, p. 92.
- Lichtelektrische Filterfotometrie der Flußdepression bei 5200 Å in Ap-Sternen ("Photoelectric filter photometry of the 5200-Å flux depression in Ap stars", German) in Astronomy and Astrophysics, 52, 223, 1976.
- Durchmusterung offener Sternhaufen nach CP2-Sternen ("Survey of open star clusters associated with CP2 stars", German) in Mitteilungen der Astronomischen Gesellschaft 65, 22, 1986.
- HIP 60350: an extreme runaway star in Astronomy and Astrophysics, 339, 782 (1998).
- On the detection of the first extragalactic classical chemically peculiar stars in Astronomy and Astrophysics, 371, L5 (2001).
