= HD 98649 =

Star in the constellation Crater

Observation data Epoch J2000.0 Equinox ICRS
- Constellation: Crater
- Right ascension: 11^{h} 20^{m} 51.76855^{s}
- Declination: −23° 13′ 02.4295″
- Apparent magnitude (V): +8.00

Characteristics
- Evolutionary stage: main sequence
- Spectral type: G3/5V
- B−V color index: +0.658

Astrometry
Radial velocity (R_{v})	4.25±0.12 km/s
Proper motion (μ)	RA: −199.735±0.022 mas/yr Dec.: −177.620±0.017 mas/yr
Parallax (π)	23.7206±0.0216 mas
Distance	137.5 ± 0.1 ly (42.16 ± 0.04 pc)
Absolute magnitude (M_{V})	+4.91

Details
Mass	0.97±0.02 M_{☉}
Radius	1.01±0.02 R_{☉}
Luminosity (bolometric)	0.968±0.019 L_{☉}
Luminosity (visual, L_{V})	0.98±0.003 L_{☉}
Surface gravity (log g)	4.38±0.08 cgs
Temperature	5,759±35 K
Metallicity [Fe/H]	0.05±0.04 dex
Rotation	27±4.0 days
Rotational velocity (v sin i)	1.19 km/s
Age	4.44^{+0.68}_{−0.58} Gyr

Other designations
- BD−22°3121, HD 98649, HIP 55409, SAO 179793, LTT 4199

Database references
SIMBAD	data
Exoplanet Archive	data

HD 98649 is a star with an orbiting exoplanet in the southern constellation Crater. Based on parallax measurements, it is situated at a distance of 137.5 light years from the Sun. The system is drifting further away with a heliocentric radial velocity of 4.3 km/s. With an apparent visual magnitude of +8.00, it is too faint to be viewed with the naked eye. The system has a relatively high proper motion, traversing the celestial sphere at an angular rate of 0.24″·yr^{−1}.

The spectrum of HD 98649 presents as an ordinary G-type main-sequence star with a stellar classification of G3/5V. It is around 4.4 billion years old and is spinning slowly with a rotation period of roughly 27 days. The star is similar to the Sun, having nearly the same size, mass, and luminosity. It is considered a solar analog. The level of magnetic activity in the chromosphere is minimal.

== Planetary system ==
From 1998 to 2012, the star was under observance from the CORALIE echelle spectrograph at La Silla Observatory. In 2012, a long-period, wide-orbiting exoplanet was deduced by Doppler spectroscopy. This was published in November. The discoverers noted, "HD 98649b is in the top five of the most eccentric planetary orbit and the most eccentric planet known with a period larger than 600 days." The reason for this high eccentricity is unknown. The team proposed it as a candidate for direct imaging, once it gets out to 10.4 AU at apoastron, or 250 milliarcseconds of separation as viewed from Earth.

Using astrometry from Gaia, astronomers were able to deduce the true mass of HD 98649 b as 9.7 M_{J}, somewhat higher than its minimum mass deduced from radial velocity measurements.

The HD 98649 planetary system
Companion (in order from star)	Mass	Semimajor axis (AU)	Orbital period (years)	Eccentricity	Inclination (°)	Radius
b	9.7+2.3 −1.9 M_{J}	5.97+0.24 −0.21	14.74+0.88 −0.75	0.852+0.033 −0.022	43.7+13 −8.1	—
