= Eta Crateris =

Star in the constellation Crater

- Location of η Crateris (circled)

Observation data Epoch J2000.0 Equinox J2000.0 (ICRS)
- Constellation: Crater
- Right ascension: 11^{h} 56^{m} 00.954^{s}
- Declination: −17° 09′ 02.968″
- Apparent magnitude (V): 5.17

Characteristics
- Spectral type: A0 V
- U−B color index: −0.06
- B−V color index: −0.022±0.002
- Variable type: constant

Astrometry
| Radial velocity (R_{v}) | +15.0±4.2 km/s |
| Proper motion (μ) | RA: −49.952 mas/yr Dec.: −8.271 mas/yr |
| Parallax (π) | 13.0075±0.1226 mas |
| Distance | 251 ± 2 ly (76.9 ± 0.7 pc) |
| Absolute magnitude (M_{V}) | +1.00 |

Details
| Mass | 2.55±0.02 M_{☉} |
| Radius | 2.47 R_{☉} |
| Luminosity | 57±2 L_{☉} |
| Temperature | 9,930±90 K |
| Rotational velocity (v sin i) | 65 km/s |
| Age | 350 Myr |

Other designations
- η Crt, 30 Crateris, BD−16°3358, FK5 1309, HD 103632, HIP 58188, HR 4567, SAO 156988

Database references
| SIMBAD | data |

Eta Crateris is a solitary star in the southern constellation of Crater. Its name is a Bayer designation that is Latinized from η Crateris and abbreviated Eta Crt or η Crt. This star marks the lip of the tilted bowl on the left side in the constellation. Eta Crateris lies in the sky NE of Zeta Crateris and NNW of 31 Crateris, the three stars forming an almost perfect right triangle with Eta at the right angle and 31 and Zeta the ends of the hypotenuse. Eta Crateris also lies to the right (west) of the bright star Gamma Corvi.

This star is faintly visible to the naked eye with an apparent visual magnitude of 5.17. With an annual parallax shift of 13.01 mas as seen from Earth, it is located around 251 light-years (77 pc) from the Sun. At that distance, the visual magnitude is diminished by an extinction factor of 0.08 due to interstellar dust. The star is receding from the Sun with a radial velocity of +15 km/s.

Eta Crateris is an ordinary A-type main sequence star with a stellar classification of A0 V. It has 2.55 times the mass and 2.47 times the radius of the Sun. It radiates 57 times the solar luminosity from its outer atmosphere at an effective temperature of 9,930 K. It is 350 million years old and is spinning with a projected rotational velocity of 65 km/s.
