= Psi Crateris =

Star in the constellation Crater

Observation data Epoch J2000.0 Equinox J2000.0 (ICRS)
- Constellation: Crater
- Right ascension: 11^{h} 12^{m} 30.37188^{s}
- Declination: −18° 29′ 59.4995″
- Apparent magnitude (V): 6.13 (6.24 + 8.34)

Characteristics
- Spectral type: A0 V (A0 + A3)
- B−V color index: −0.01

Astrometry
Radial velocity (R_{v})	+14.2±0.7 km/s
Proper motion (μ)	RA: −20.48 mas/yr Dec.: −24.80 mas/yr
Parallax (π)	6.50±0.71 mas
Distance	approx. 500 ly (approx. 150 pc)
Absolute magnitude (M_{V})	+0.21

Orbit
Period (P)	365.68±8.02 yr
Semi-major axis (a)	0.553±0.022″
Eccentricity (e)	0.434±0.014
Inclination (i)	99.8±0.8°
Longitude of the node (Ω)	325.3±0.6°
Periastron epoch (T)	1983.92 ± 3.59
Argument of periastron (ω) (secondary)	337.3±6.7°

Details

ψ Crt A
Luminosity	75 L_{☉}
Surface gravity (log g)	3.8 cgs
Temperature	9,199 K
Metallicity [Fe/H]	0.0 dex
Rotational velocity (v sin i)	33 km/s

Other designations
- ψ Crt, BD−17°3321, HD 97411, HIP 54742, HR 4347, SAO 156528, WDS J11125-1830AB

Database references
SIMBAD	ψ Crt
- ψ Crt A
- ψ Crt B

Psi Crateris is a visual binary star system in the southern constellation of Crater. Its name is a Bayer designation that is Latinized from ψ Crateris and abbreviated Psi Crt or ψ Crt. This system is faintly visible to the naked eye as a point of light with an apparent visual magnitude of 6.13. According to the Bortle scale, it requires dark suburban or rural skies to view. Based upon an annual parallax shift of 6.5 mas, the system is located approximately 500 light years away from the Sun.

The components in this star system have an orbital period of about 366 years with an eccentricity of 0.43. The angular size of the orbit's semimajor axis is about half an arc second. The orbital plane is inclined at an angle of 100° to the plane of the sky.

The primary member, component A, is an ordinary A-type main sequence star with a visual magnitude of 6.24 and a stellar classification of A0 V. It was a candidate λ Boötis star, but this was later rejected when the spectrum was found to be normal. Any peculiarities may have instead resulted from the overlapping spectra of the two stars. The star is radiating about 75 times the solar luminosity from it outer atmosphere at an effective temperature of 9,199 K. The fainter secondary, component B, has a visual magnitude of 8.34 and a class of A3.
