= WASP-34 =

Star in the constellation Crater

Observation data Epoch J2000.0 Equinox ICRS
- Constellation: Crater
- Right ascension: 11^{h} 01^{m} 35.8978^{s}
- Declination: −23° 51′ 38.387″
- Apparent magnitude (V): +10.28

Characteristics
- Evolutionary stage: main sequence
- Spectral type: G5

Astrometry
Radial velocity (R_{v})	49.84±0.21 km/s
Proper motion (μ)	RA: −43.846 mas/yr Dec.: −65.637 mas/yr
Parallax (π)	7.6211±0.0164 mas
Distance	428.0 ± 0.9 ly (131.2 ± 0.3 pc)

Details
Mass	1.01±0.07 M_{☉}
Radius	0.93±0.12 R_{☉}
Luminosity	1.19±0.03 L_{☉}
Surface gravity (log g)	4.5±0.1 cgs
Temperature	5,700±100 K
Metallicity [Fe/H]	−0.02±0.10 dex
Rotation	34±15 d
Rotational velocity (v sin i)	1.4±0.6 km/s
Age	6.8±1.3 Gyr

Other designations
- Amansinaya, CD−23 9677, CPD−23 5039, SAO 179442, TOI-744, TIC 437242640, WASP-34, TYC 6636-540-1, GSC 06636-00540, 2MASS J11013589-2351382, DENIS J110135.9-235138

Database references
SIMBAD	data
Exoplanet Archive	data

WASP-34, also named Amansinaya, is a Sun-like star about 428 light-years (131 parsecs) away in the constellation Crater. With spectral type G5V, it has 1.01 times the mass and 0.93 times the diameter of the Sun. It rotates on its axis every 34±15 days, indicating it is around 6.7 billion years old. It hosts at least two exoplanets.

== Naming ==
The designation WASP-34 comes from the Wide Angle Search for Planets. In 2019 the IAU announced as part of NameExoWorlds that WASP-34 and its planet WASP-34b would be given official names chosen by school children from the Philippines. The star is named Amansinaya, after Aman Sinaya, which is one of the two trinity deities of the Philippine's Tagalog mythology, and is the primordial deity of the ocean and protector of fisherman. The planet WASP-34b is named Haik. Haik is the successor of the primordial Aman Sinaya as the god of the sea of the Philippines' Tagalog mythology.

== Planetary system ==
WASP-34 has a transiting planet discovered in 2011 by the Wide Angle Search for Planets. This is a hot Jupiter, with just over half the mass of Jupiter and taking just 4.3 days to complete an orbit. It has a near-grazing transit, passing in front of the limb of the star. The planetary color was found to be redder than other hot Jupiters, hinting at peculiar chemistry. The planet has a large measured temperature difference between the dayside (1185±47 K) and nightside (726±119 K).

There is a long-period radial velocity trend, showing evidence for a massive object orbiting further out. A 2014 study suggested an object at least 15 times the mass of Jupiter at a distance of 5 AU. A 2026 study confirmed a second planet; it is smaller and closer to the star than previously thought, with a minimum mass of about 5 Jupiter masses and orbiting at a distance of 3 AU. There may also be a third planet; if so, the two outer planets would be near a 3:2 mean-motion resonance.

The WASP-34 planetary system
Companion (in order from star)	Mass	Semimajor axis (AU)	Orbital period (days)	Eccentricity	Inclination (°)	Radius
b / Haik	0.583+0.030 −0.031 M_{J}	0.0521±0.0012	4.3176782(45)	<0.025	85.2±0.2	1.22+0.11 −0.08 R_{J}
c	≥5.29+0.21 −0.28 M_{J}	3.158+0.049 −0.082	2033.4+3.6 −6.5	0.214+0.009 −0.014	—	—
d (unconfirmed)	≥1.24+0.52 −0.55 M_{J}	—	3083+293 −238	0.243+0.050 −0.243	—	—
