= Zeta Crateris =

Probable binary star system in the constellation Crater

- Location of ζ Crateris (circled)

Observation data Epoch J2000.0 Equinox J2000.0 (ICRS)
- Constellation: Crater
- Right ascension: 11^{h} 44^{m} 45.776^{s}
- Declination: −18° 21′ 02.435″
- Apparent magnitude (V): 4.740 (4.95 + 7.84)

Characteristics
- Evolutionary stage: red clump
- Spectral type: G8 III
- U−B color index: +0.724
- B−V color index: +0.961
- Variable type: Constant

Astrometry
Radial velocity (R_{v})	−4.10±0.33 km/s
Proper motion (μ)	RA: +27.298 mas/yr Dec.: −24.644 mas/yr
Parallax (π)	9.5113±0.2042 mas
Distance	343 ± 7 ly (105 ± 2 pc)
Absolute magnitude (M_{V})	−0.66

Details
Mass	3.4±0.1 M_{☉}
Radius	16.8±0.5 R_{☉}
Luminosity	150±6 L_{☉}
Surface gravity (log g)	2.50±0.01 cgs
Temperature	5,032±8 K
Metallicity [Fe/H]	−0.11 dex
Age	271±34 Myr

Other designations
- ζ Crt, 27 Crateris, BD−17°3460, FK5 1301, HD 102070, HIP 57283, HR 4514, SAO 156869, WDS J11448-1821AB

Database references
SIMBAD	data

Zeta Crateris is a binary star system in the southern constellation of Crater, the cup. Its name is a Bayer designation that is Latinized from ζ Crateris and abbreviated Zeta Crt or ζ Crt. The system is located about half-way between the stars Epsilon Corvi to the southeast and Delta Crateris to the northwest, which marks the lower left corner of the rim of the cup.

Zeta Crateris is a photometrically constant system that is visible to the naked eye with an apparent visual magnitude of 4.740. With an annual parallax shift of 9.24 mas as viewed from Earth, Zeta Crateris is located approximately 343 light-years (105 pc) from the Sun. At that distance, the visual magnitude of the system is diminished by an extinction factor of 0.21 due to interstellar dust.

The two components of this system had an angular separation of 0.20 arc seconds along a position angle of 22°, as of 1991. The primary, component A, is a magnitude 4.95 evolved giant star with a stellar classification of G8 III. It is a red clump star that is generating energy through the fusion of helium at its core. With 3.4 times the Sun's mass, Zeta Crateris has expanded to 16.8 times the radius of the Sun and shines with 150 times the Sun's luminosity. This energy is being radiated into outer space from the outer envelope at an effective temperature of 5,032 K.

The secondary, component B, is a magnitude 7.84 star. Zeta Crateris is a confirmed member of the Sirius supercluster and is a candidate member of the Ursa Major Moving Group, a collection of stars that share a similar motion through space and may have at one time been members of the same open cluster.
