= BD−10°3166 =

Star in the constellation Crater

Observation data Epoch J2000 Equinox J2000
- Constellation: Crater
- Right ascension: 10^{h} 58^{m} 28.7841^{s}
- Declination: −10° 46′ 13.395″
- Apparent magnitude (V): 10.02

Characteristics
- Evolutionary stage: main sequence
- Spectral type: K3.0V
- B−V color index: 0.85

Astrometry
| Radial velocity (R_{v}) | 26.4±2 km/s |
| Proper motion (μ) | RA: −185.695±0.019 mas/yr Dec.: −8.175±0.016 mas/yr |
| Parallax (π) | 11.948±0.0178 mas |
| Distance | 273.0 ± 0.4 ly (83.7 ± 0.1 pc) |
| Absolute magnitude (M_{V}) | +5.4 |

Details
| Mass | 0.94 M_{☉} |
| Radius | 0.9 R_{☉} |
| Luminosity | 0.56 L_{☉} |
| Surface gravity (log g) | 4.5 cgs |
| Temperature | 5257 K |
| Metallicity [Fe/H] | 0.30 dex |
| Rotational velocity (v sin i) | 5.4 km/s |
| Age | 5.2±3.4 Gyr |

Other designations
- GSC 05503-00946

Database references
| SIMBAD | data |
| Exoplanet Archive | data |

BD−10°3166 is a K-type main sequence star approximately 268 light-years away in the constellation of Crater. It was inconspicuous enough not be included in the Draper catalog (HD). The Hipparcos satellite also did not study it, so its true distance was poorly known. The distance measured by the Gaia spacecraft of 273 light years rules out a suggested companion star, LP 731-076, being its true binary star companion.

== Stellar characteristics ==
The star is very enriched with metals, being two to three times as metal-rich as the Sun. Planets are common around such stars, and BD−10°3166 is not an exception. In 2000, the California and Carnegie Planet Search team discovered an extrasolar planet orbiting the star.

== Planetary system ==
In 2000, the California and Carnegie Planet Search discovered a hot Jupiter-type extrasolar planet that has a minimum mass less than half that of Jupiter's, and which takes only 3.49 days to revolve around BD−10°3166.

The BD−10°3166 planetary system
| Companion (in order from star) | Mass | Semimajor axis (AU) | Orbital period (days) | Eccentricity | Inclination | Radius |
|---|---|---|---|---|---|---|
| b | >0.458 ± 0.039 M_{J} | 0.0452 ± 0.0026 | 3.48777 ± 0.00011 | 0.019 ± 0.023 | — | 1.03 R_{J} |

== See also ==
- Lists of exoplanets
