= Two-Micron Sky Survey =

Two-Micron Sky Survey, or IRC, or Caltech infrared catalog is the astronomical catalogue of the infrared sources published in the 1969 by Gerry Neugebauer and Robert B. Leighton.

The survey was conducted using a 62 inch telescope with an f/1 aluminized epoxy primary mirror, located at Mount Wilson Observatory. Eight liquid nitrogen-cooled lead sulfide photodetectors were mounted at the instrument's focal plane. A mirror oscillated at 20 Hz to make the astronomical image alternate between 2 photodetectors at 20 Hz, and only the alternating signal was amplified. The results were recorded on a strip chart, which was later digitized to allow processing with an IBM 7094 computer.

Catalogue index consists of two numbers - declination rounded to multiplier of 10 degrees, with sign, and star ordinal number within declination band. Catalog contains about 5000 objects between declinations +15 and -15 degrees. Most of the sources are M-type stars. A supplement was also published with further data on 831 sources.
