= Delta Crateris =

K-type giant star in the constellation Crater

- Location of δ Crateris (circled)

Observation data Epoch J2000 Equinox J2000
- Constellation: Crater
- Right ascension: 11^{h} 19^{m} 20.4473^{s}
- Declination: −14° 46′ 42.743″
- Apparent magnitude (V): 3.56

Characteristics
- Evolutionary stage: red clump
- Spectral type: K0 III
- B−V color index: 1.12

Astrometry
Radial velocity (R_{v})	−4.94±0.21 km/s
Proper motion (μ)	RA: −122.958 mas/yr Dec.: +207.083 mas/yr
Parallax (π)	17.017±0.1617 mas
Distance	192 ± 2 ly (58.8 ± 0.6 pc)
Absolute magnitude (M_{V})	−0.321

Details
Mass	1.47±0.2 M_{☉}
Radius	20.14±0.48 R_{☉}
Luminosity	154.8±4.9 L_{☉}
Surface gravity (log g)	2.00±0.08 cgs
Temperature	4,540±40 K
Metallicity [Fe/H]	−0.43±0.10 dex
Age	2.89 Gyr

Other designations
- Labrum, δ Crt, 12 Crateris, BD−13°3345, FK5 426, HD 98430, HIP 55282, HR 4382, SAO 156605

Database references
SIMBAD	data

Delta Crateris is a solitary star in the southern constellation of Crater. Its name is a Bayer designation that is Latinized from δ Crateris and abbreviated Delta Crt or δ Crt. With an apparent visual magnitude of 3.56, it is the brightest star in this rather dim constellation. It has an annual parallax shift of 17.017 mas as measured from Earth, indicating Delta Crateris lies at a distance of approximately 192 light-years (59 pc) from the Sun.

== Characteristics ==
This is an evolved orange-hued giant star belonging to the spectral class K0 III. Delta Crateris is a member of the so-called red clump, indicating that it is generating energy through the thermonuclear fusion of helium at its core. The star has an estimated 1.47 times the mass of the Sun but has expanded to 20 times the Sun's radius.

It is around 2.89 billion years old with a rotation rate that is too small to measure; the projected rotational velocity is 0.0 km/s. Delta Crateris is radiating 171.4±9.0 as much luminosity as the Sun from its outer envelope at an effective temperature of 4,540 K.

This star is occasionally called by the name Labrum, usually in an astrological context.
