= Crater (constellation) =

Constellation in the southern celestial hemisphere

- Constellation
- List of stars in Crater
- Abbreviation: Crt
- Genitive: Crateris
- Pronunciation: /ˈkreɪtər/, genitive /krəˈtiːrɪs/
- Symbolism: the cup
- Right ascension: 10^{h} 51^{m} 06.1297^{s}–11^{h} 56^{m} 23.6655^{s}
- Declination: −6.6621790°–−25.1957951°
- Area: 282 sq. deg. (53rd)
- Main stars: 4
- Bayer/Flamsteed stars: 12
- Stars brighter than 3.00^{m}: 0
- Stars within 10.00 pc (32.62 ly): 0
- Brightest star: δ Crt (3.57^{m})
- Nearest star: LHS 2358
- Messier objects: 0
- Meteor showers: Eta Craterids
- Bordering constellations: Leo; Sextans; Hydra; Corvus; Virgo
- Visible at latitudes between +65° and −90°. Best visible at 21:00 (9 p.m.) during the month of April.

Crater is a small constellation in the southern celestial hemisphere. Its name is the Latinization of the Greek krater, a type of cup used to water down wine. One of the 48 constellations listed by the second-century astronomer Ptolemy, it depicts a cup that has been associated with the god Apollo and is perched on the back of Hydra the water snake.

There is no star brighter than third magnitude in the constellation. Its two brightest stars, Delta Crateris of magnitude 3.56 and Alpha Crateris of magnitude 4.07, are ageing orange giant stars that are cooler and larger than the Sun. Beta Crateris is a binary star system composed of a white giant star and a white dwarf. Seven star systems have been found to host planets. A few notable galaxies, including Crater 2 and NGC 3981, and a famous quasar lie within the borders of the constellation.

== Mythology ==
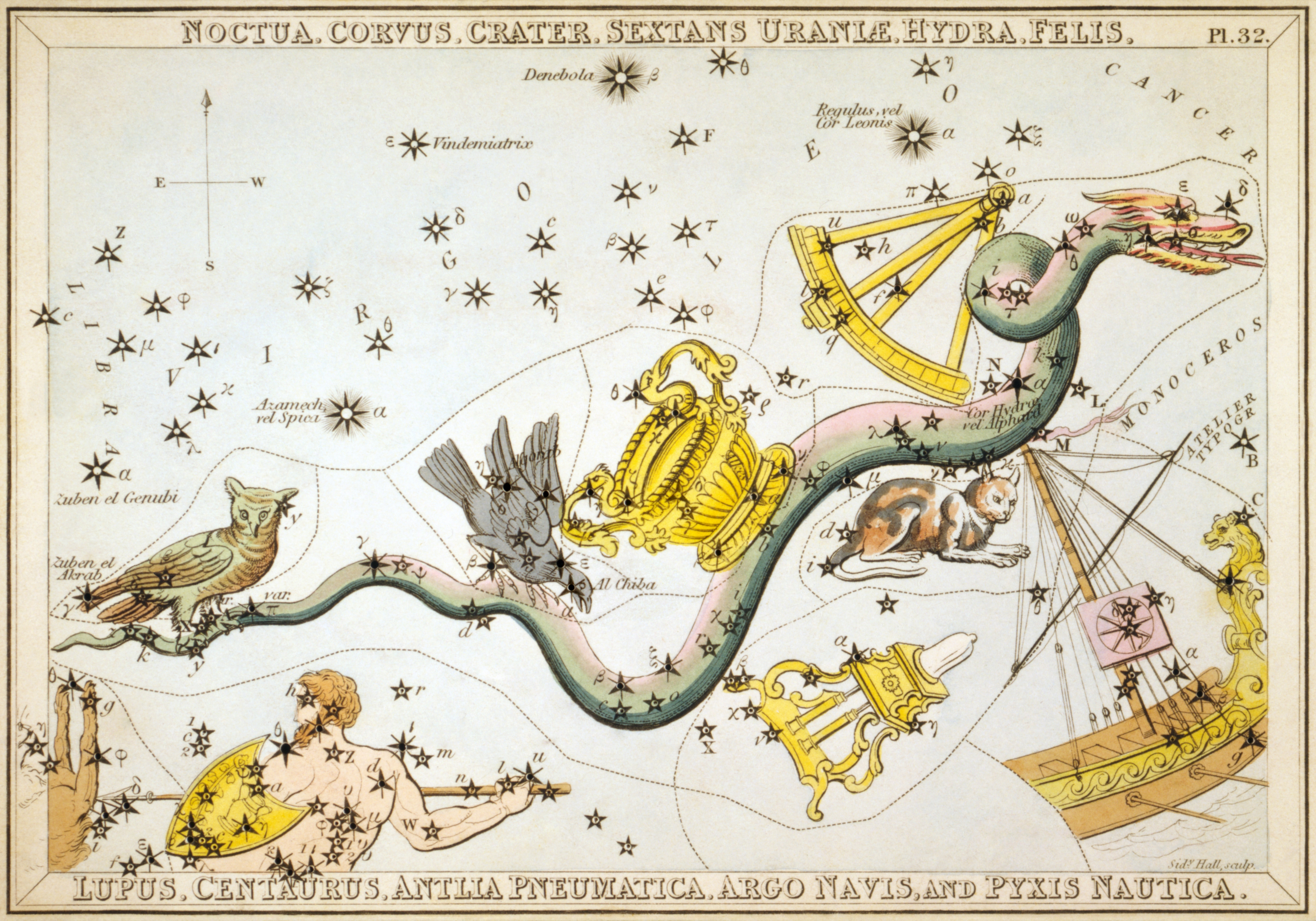
Corvus, Crater, and other constellations seen around Hydra, from Urania's Mirror (1825). Crater (centre) is depicted as a gold, double-handled cup with decorative filigree.

In the Babylonian star catalogues dating from at least 1100 BC, the stars of Crater were possibly incorporated with those of the crow Corvus in the Babylonian Raven (MULUGAMUSHEN). British scientist John H. Rogers observed that the adjoining constellation Hydra signified Ningishzida, the god of the underworld in the Babylonian compendium MUL.APIN. He proposed that Corvus and Crater (along with the water snake Hydra) were death symbols and marked the gate to the underworld. Corvus and Crater also featured in the iconography of Mithraism, which is thought to have been of middle-eastern origin before spreading into Ancient Greece and Rome.

Crater is identified with a story from Greek mythology in which a crow or raven serves Apollo, and is sent to fetch water, but it delays its journey as it finds some figs and waits for them to ripen before eating them. Finally, it retrieves the water in a cup and takes back a water snake, blaming it for drinking the water. According to the myth, Apollo saw through the fraud, and angrily cast the crow, cup, and snake into the sky. The three constellations were arranged in such a way that the crow was prevented from drinking from the cup, and hence seen as a warning against sinning against the gods.

Phylarchus wrote of a different origin for Crater. He told how the city of Eleusa near Troy was beset by plague. Its ruler Demophon consulted an oracle which decreed that a maiden should be sacrificed each year. Demophon declared that he would choose a maiden by lottery, but he did not include his own daughters. One nobleman, Mastusius, objected, forcing Demophon to sacrifice his daughter. Later, Mastusius killed Demophon's daughters and tricked the ruler in drinking a cup containing a mixture of their blood and wine. Upon finding out the deed, the king ordered Mastusius and the cup to be thrown into the sea. Crater signifies the cup.

=== In non-Western astronomy ===
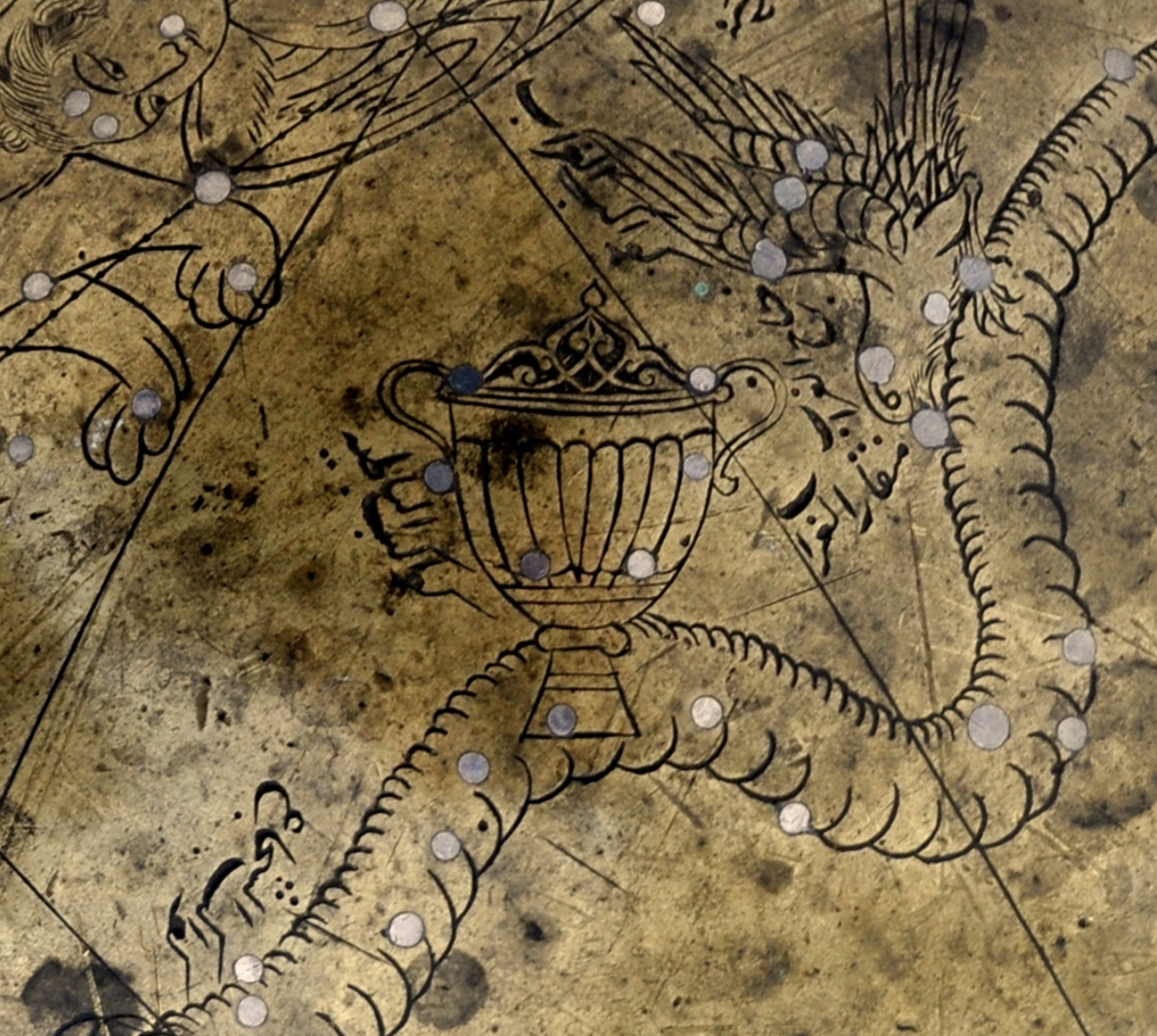
Crater as depicted on The Manuchihr Globe made in Mashhad 1632-33 AD. Adilnor Collection, Sweden.

In Chinese astronomy, the stars of Crater are located within the constellation of the Vermillion Bird of the South (南方朱雀, Nán Fāng Zhū Què). They depict, along with some stars from Hydra, Yi, the Red Bird's wings. Yi also denotes the 27th lunar mansion. Alternatively, Yi depicts a heroic bowman; his bow composed of other stars in Hydra. In the Society Islands, Crater was recognized as a constellation called Moana-'ohu-noa-'ei-ha'a-moe-hara ("vortex-ocean-in-which-to-lose-crime").

== Characteristics ==
Covering 282.4 square degrees and hence 0.685% of the sky, Crater ranks 53rd of the 88 constellations in area. It is bordered by Leo and Virgo to the north, Corvus to the east, Hydra to the south and west, and Sextans to the northwest. The three-letter abbreviation for the constellation, as adopted by the International Astronomical Union in 1922, is "Crt". The official constellation boundaries, as set by Belgian astronomer Eugène Delporte in 1930, are defined by a polygon of six segments (illustrated in infobox). In the equatorial coordinate system, the right ascension coordinates of these borders lie between 10^{h} 51^{m} 14^{s} and 11^{h} 56^{m} 24^{s}, while the declination coordinates are between −6.66° and −25.20°. Its position in the southern celestial hemisphere means that the whole constellation is visible to observers south of 65°N. (Note: While parts of the constellation technically rise above the horizon to observers between the 65°N and 83°N, stars within a few degrees of the horizon are to all intents and purposes unobservable.)

== Features ==
=== Stars ===
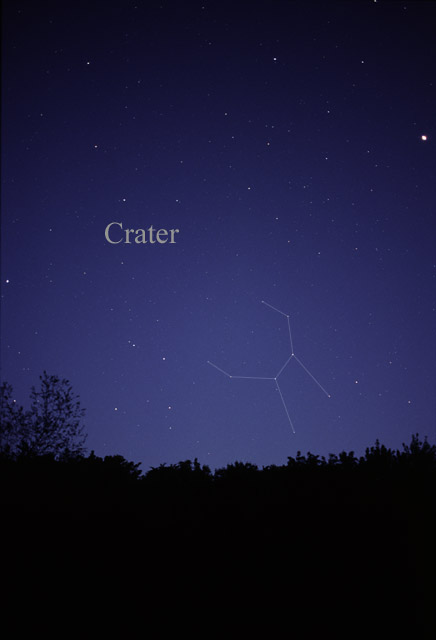
The constellation Crater as it can be seen by the naked eye.

The German cartographer Johann Bayer used the Greek letters alpha through lambda to label the most prominent stars in the constellation. Bode added more, though only Psi Crateris remains in use. John Flamsteed gave 31 stars in Crater and the segment of Hydra immediately below Crater Flamsteed designations, naming the resulting constellation Hydra et Crater. Most of these stars lie in Hydra. The three brightest stars—Delta, Alpha, and Gamma Crateris—form a triangle located near the brighter star Nu Hydrae in Hydra. Within the constellation's borders, there are 33 stars brighter than or equal to apparent magnitude 6.5. (Note: Objects of magnitude 6.5 are among the faintest visible to the unaided eye in suburban-rural transition night skies.)

Delta Crateris is the brightest star in Crater at magnitude 3.6. Located 163 ± 4 light-years away, it is an orange giant star of spectral type K0III that is 1.0–1.4 times as massive as the Sun. An ageing star, it has cooled and expanded to 22.44 ± 0.28 times the Sun's radius. It is radiating 171.4 ± 9.0 as much power as the Sun from its outer envelope at an effective temperature of 4,408 ± 57 K. Traditionally called Alkes "the cup", (Note: from Arabic الكأس alka's) and marking the base of the cup is Alpha Crateris, an orange-hued star of magnitude 4.1, that is 141 ± 2 light-years from the Sun. With an estimated mass 1.75 ± 0.24 times that of the Sun, it has exhausted its core hydrogen and expanded to 13.2 ± 0.55 times the Sun's diameter, shining with 69 times its luminosity and an effective temperature of around 4600 K.

With a magnitude of 4.5, Beta Crateris is a binary star system, consisting of a white-hued giant star of spectral type A1III and a white dwarf of spectral type DA1.4, 296 ± 8 light-years from the Sun. Much smaller than the primary, the white dwarf cannot be seen as a separate object, even by the Hubble Space Telescope. Gamma Crateris is a double star, resolvable in small amateur telescopes. The primary is a white main sequence star of spectral type A7V, that is an estimated 1.81 times as massive as the Sun, while the secondary—of magnitude 9.6—has 75% the Sun's mass, and is likely an orange dwarf. The two stars take at least 1150 years to orbit each other. The system is 85.6 ± 0.8 light-years away from the Sun.

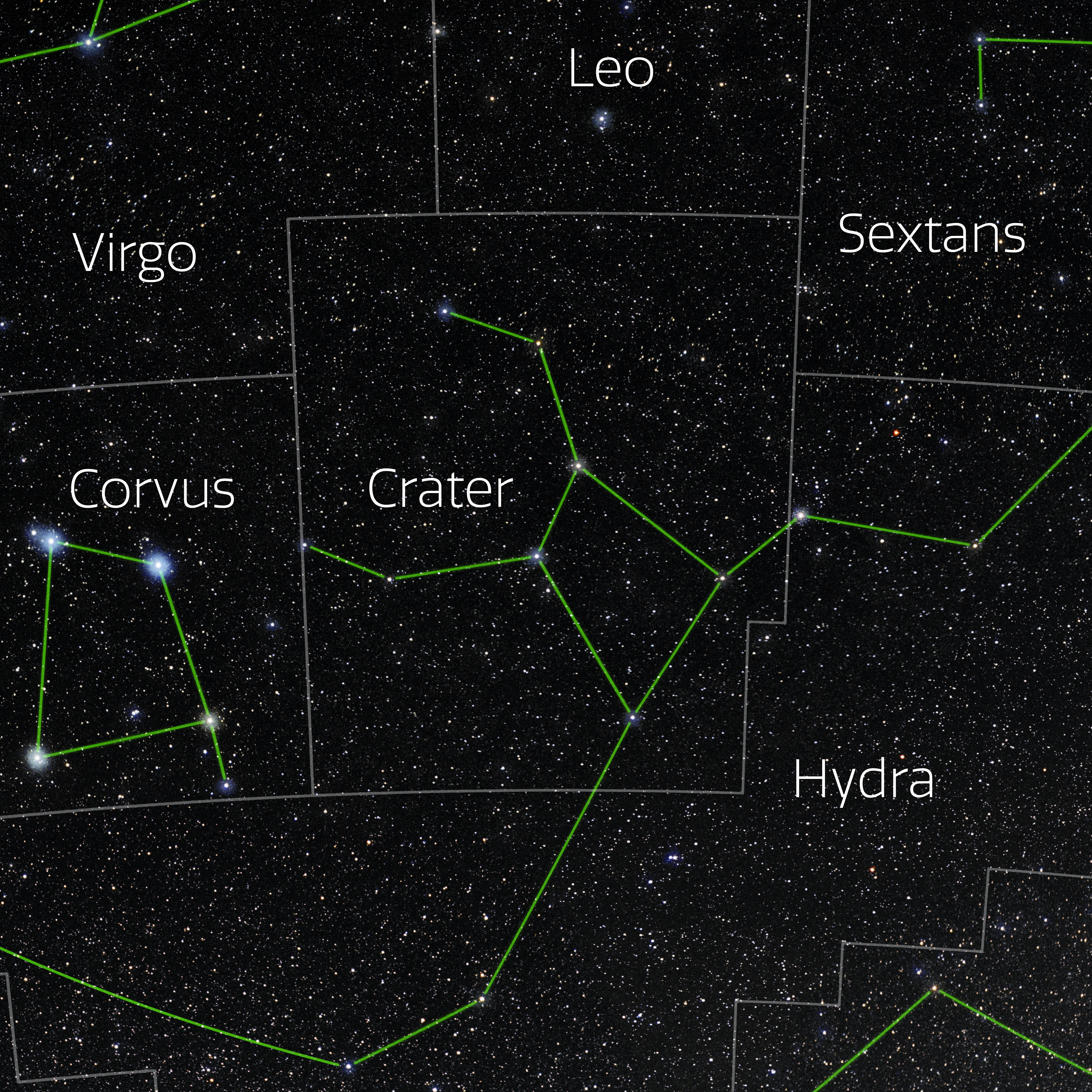
The constellation Crater showing the IAU boundaries, the constellation stick figure, and labels for its brightest stars. Astrophotograph by Eckhard Slawik, from NOIRLab's 88 Constellations project.

Epsilon and Zeta Crateris mark the Cup's rim. The largest naked eye star in the constellation, Epsilon Crateris is an evolved K-type giant star with a stellar classification of K5 III. It has about the same mass as the Sun, but has expanded to 44.7 times the Sun's radius. The star is radiating 391 times the solar luminosity. It is 366 ± 8 light-years distant from the Sun. Zeta Crateris is a binary star system. The primary, component A, is a magnitude 4.95 evolved giant star with a stellar classification of G8 III. It is a red clump star that is generating energy through the fusion of helium at its core. Zeta Crateris has expanded to 13 times the radius of the Sun, and shines with 157 times the luminosity of the Sun. The secondary, component B, is a magnitude 7.84 star. Zeta Crateris is a confirmed member of the Sirius supercluster and is a candidate member of the Ursa Major Moving Group, a collection of stars that share a similar motion through space and may have at one time been members of the same open cluster. The system is located 326 ± 9 light-years from the Sun.

Variable stars are popular targets for amateur astronomers. Their observations provide valuable contributions to understanding star behaviour. Located near Alkes is the red-hued R Crateris, a semiregular variable star of type SRb and a spectral classification of M7. It ranges from magnitude 9.8 to 11.2 over an optical period of 160 days. It is 770 ± 40 light-years distant from the Sun. TT Crateris is a cataclysmic variable; a binary system composed of a white dwarf around as massive as the Sun in close orbit with an orange dwarf of spectral type K5V. The two orbit each other every 6 hours 26 minutes. The white dwarf strips matter off its companion, forming an accretion disk which periodically ignites and erupts. The star system has a magnitude of 15.9 when quiescent, brightening to 12.7 in outburst. SZ Crateris is a magnitude 8.5 BY Draconis type variable star. It is a nearby star system located about 42.9 ± 1.0 light-years from the Sun, and is a member of the Ursa Major Moving Group.

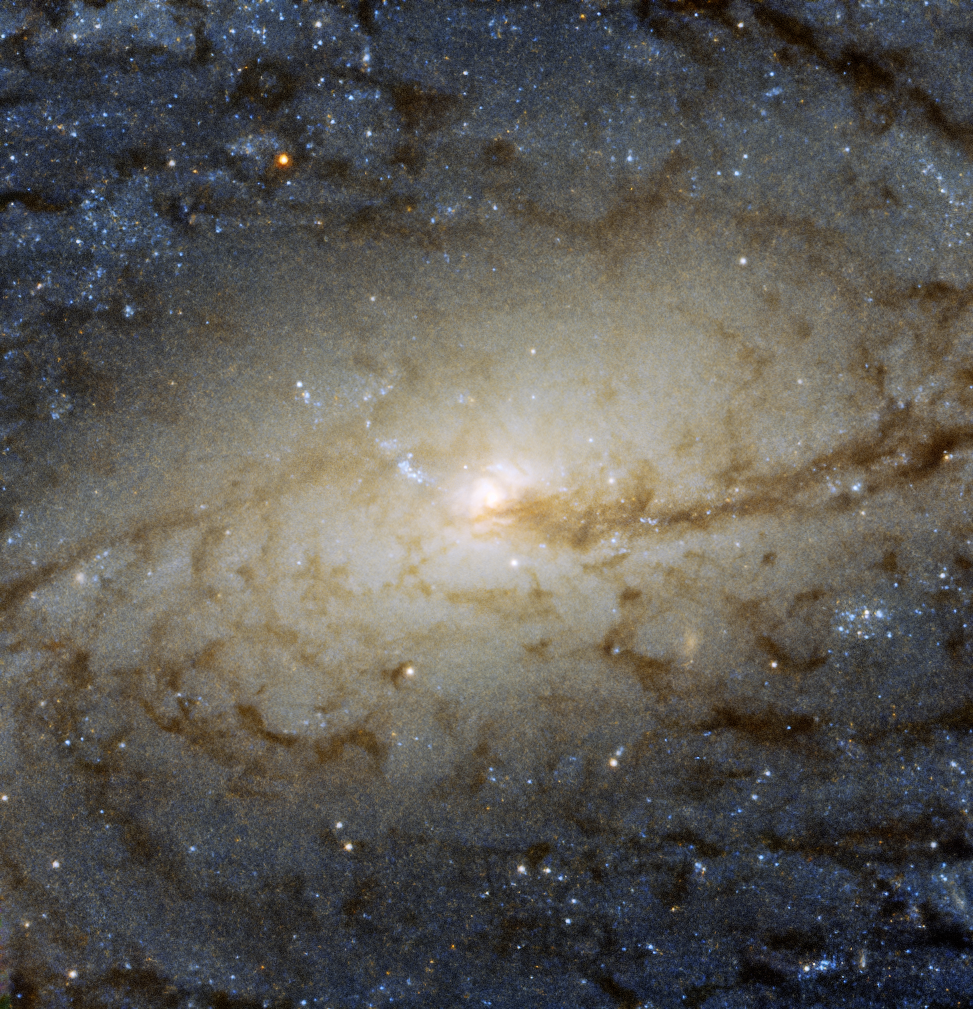
The barred spiral galaxy NGC 3887.

HD 98800, also known as TV Crateris, is a quadruple star system around 7–10 million years old, made up of two pairs of stars in close orbit. One pair has a debris disk that contains dust and gas orbiting them both. Spanning the distance between 3 and 5 astronomical units from the stars, it is thought to be a protoplanetary disk. DENIS-P J1058.7-1548 is a brown dwarf less than 5.5% as massive as the Sun. With a surface temperature of between 1700 and 2000 K, it is cool enough for clouds to form. Variations in its brightness in visible and infrared spectra suggest it has some form of atmospheric cloud cover.

HD 96167 is a star 1.31 ± 0.09 times as massive as the Sun, that has most likely exhausted its core hydrogen and begun expanding and cooling into a yellow subgiant with a diameter 1.86 ± 0.07 times that of the Sun, and 3.4 ± 0.2 times its luminosity. Analysis of its radial velocity revealed it has a planet with a minimum mass 68% that of Jupiter, which takes 498.9 ± 1.0 days to complete an orbit. With the orbital separation varying between 0.38 and 2.22 astronomical units, the orbit is highly eccentric. The stellar system is 279 ± 1 light-years away from the Sun. HD 98649 is a yellow main sequence star, classified as a G4V, that has the same mass and diameter as the Sun, but has only 86% of its luminosity. In 2012, a long-period ( 4951^{+607}_{−465} days) planet companion, at least 6.8 times as massive as Jupiter, was discovered by radial velocity method. Its orbit was calculated to be highly eccentric, swinging out to 10.6 astronomical units away from its star, and hence a candidate for direct imaging. BD-10°3166 is a metallic orange main sequence star of spectral type K3.0V, 268 ± 10 light-years distant from the Sun. It was found to have a hot Jupiter-type planet that has a minimum mass of 48% of Jupiter's, and takes only 3.49 days to complete an orbit. WASP-34 is a sun-like star of spectral type G5V that has 1.01 ± 0.07 times the mass and 0.93 ± 0.12 times the diameter of the Sun. It has a planet 0.59 ± 0.01 times as massive as Jupiter that takes 4.317 days to complete an orbit. The system is 432 ± 3 light-years distant from the Sun.

=== Deep-sky objects ===
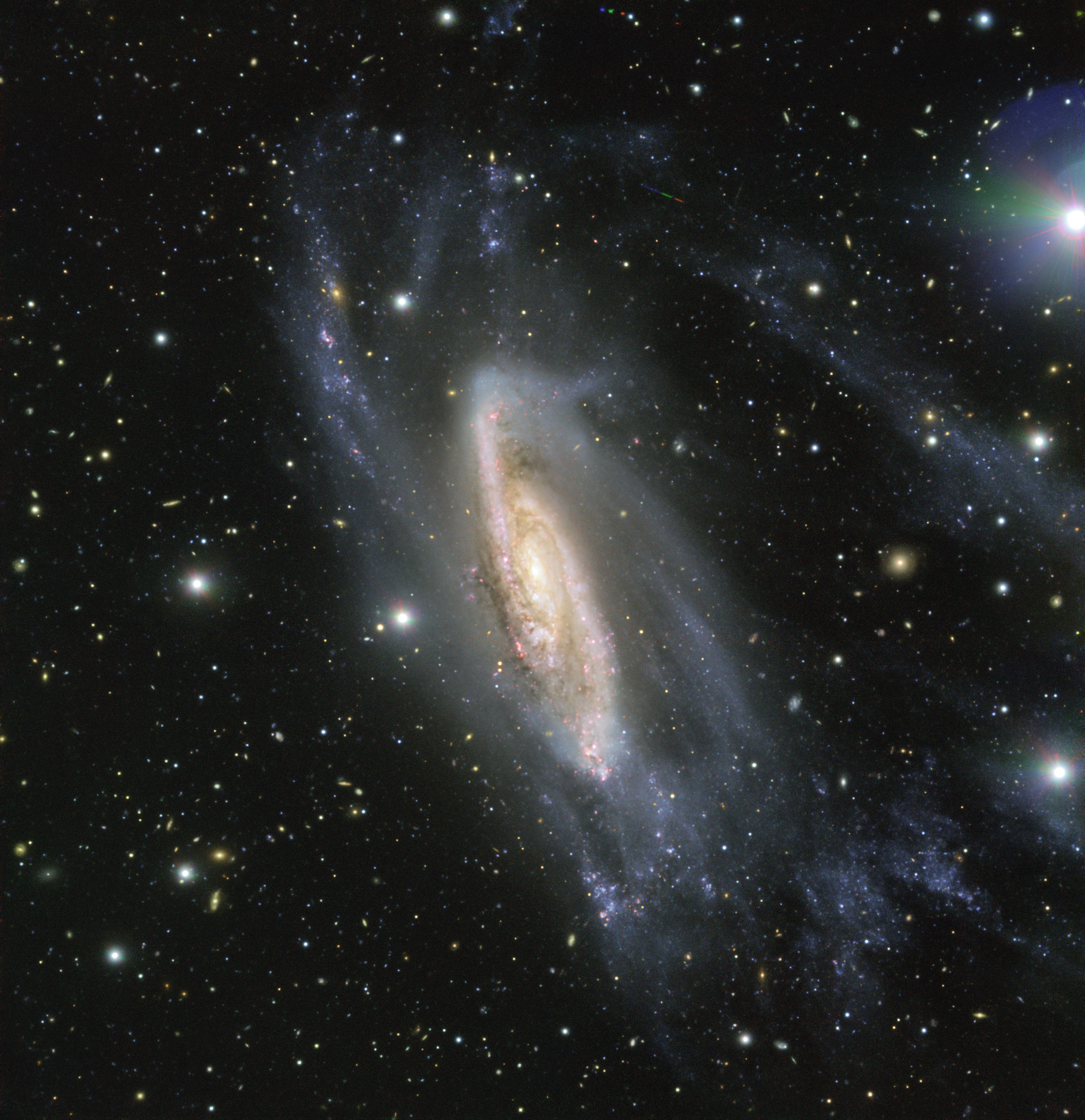
NGC 3981

The Crater 2 dwarf is a satellite galaxy of the Milky Way, located approximately 380,000 light-years from the Sun. NGC 3511 is a spiral galaxy seen nearly edge-on, of magnitude 11.0, located 2° west of Beta Crateris. Located 11' away is NGC 3513, a barred spiral galaxy. NGC 3981 is a spiral galaxy with two wide and perturbed spiral arms. It is a member of the NGC 4038 Group, which, along with NGC 3672 and NGC 3887, are part of a group of 45 galaxies known as the Crater Cloud within the Virgo Supercluster.

RX J1131 is a quasar located 6 billion light-years away from the Sun. The black hole in the center of the quasar was the first black hole whose spin has ever been directly measured. GRB 011211 was a gamma-ray burst (GRB) detected on December 11, 2001. The burst lasted 270 seconds, making it the longest burst that had ever been detected by X-ray astronomy satellite BeppoSAX up to that point. GRB 030323 lasted 26 seconds and was detected on 23 March 2003.

=== Meteor showers ===
The Eta Craterids are a faint meteor shower that takes place between 11 and 22 January, peaking around January 16 and 17, near Eta Crateris.

== See also ==
- Crater (Chinese astronomy)
