= Diamond ring nebula =

Diamond ring nebula may refer to:

- Abell 33
- Abell 70
