= NGC 2974 =

Galaxy in the constellation Sextans

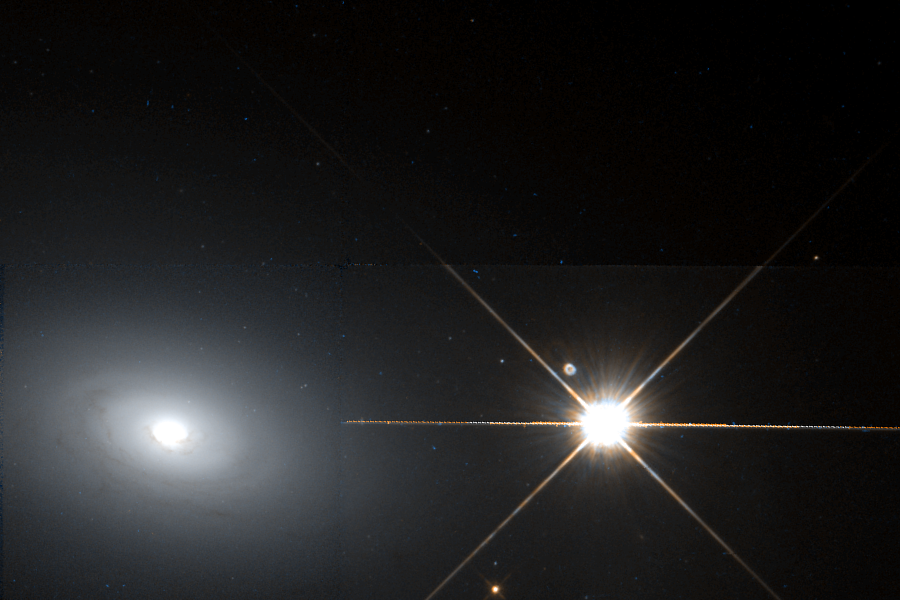
- NGC 2974 by Hubble Space Telescope

Observation data (J2000 epoch)
- Constellation: Sextans
- Right ascension: 09^{h} 42^{m} 33^{s}
- Declination: −03° 41′ 57″
- Redshift: 0.006294±0.000017
- Heliocentric radial velocity: 1,887±5 km/s
- Distance: 89 ± 29 Mly (27.3 ± 8.8 Mpc)
- Apparent magnitude (V): 10.9

Characteristics
- Type: E4
- Apparent size (V): 3.4′ × 2.1′

Other designations
- NGC 2652, UGC 172, MCG +00-25-008, PGC 27762, CGCG 007-022

NGC 2974 (also catalogued as NGC 2652) is a lenticular galaxy located in the constellation Sextans. It is located at a distance of circa 90 million light years from Earth, which, given its apparent dimensions, means that NGC 2974 is about 90,000 light years across. It was discovered by William Herschel on January 6, 1785. NGC 2974 is located in the sky about 2 and a half degrees south-south east of Iota Hydrae and more than 6 degrees northeast of Alphard. A 10th magnitude star lies next to the galaxy, thus making it a challenging object at low magnifications. NGC 2974 is part of the Herschel 400 Catalogue.

== Characteristics ==
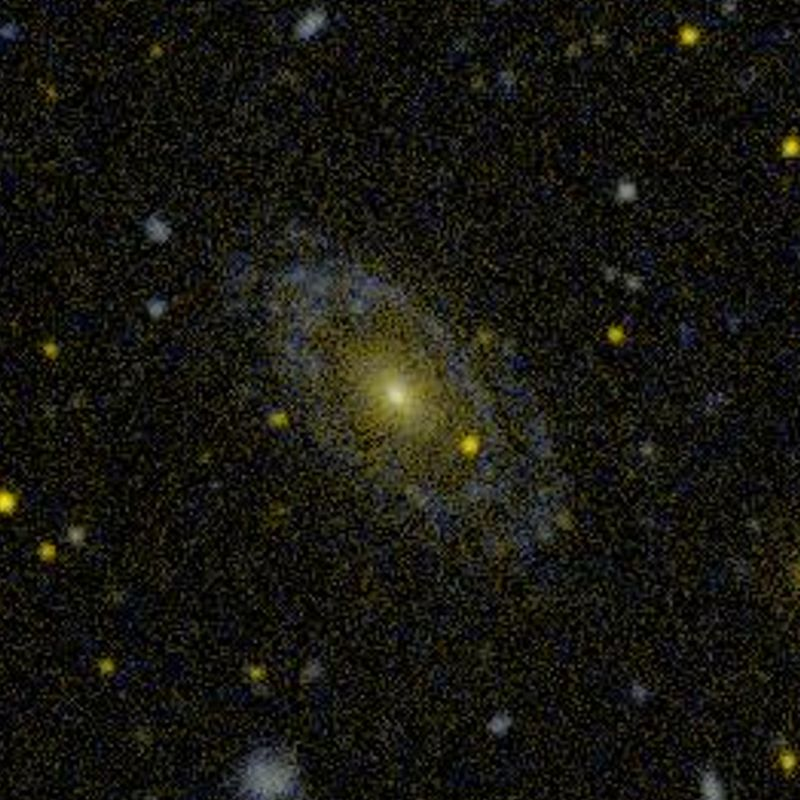
NGC 2974 by GALEX in ultraviolet, where an outer ring becomes visible.

NGC 2974 has been categorised by Gérard de Vaucouleurs as an elliptical galaxy, however there is evidence the galaxy has a disk. A rotating disk of neutral hydrogen with axis similar to that of the optical isophotes of the galaxy was detected in 1988 by Kim et al. They estimated the total HI mass to be 8×10^{8} M_{☉}. The galaxy in ultraviolet, as observed by GALEX, features an outer ring structure that holds about 1% of the total stellar mass of the galaxy and has a population of young stars. The radius of the ring is about 60 arcseconds, while one more, partial, ring has been detected in large radii. The galaxy also features multiple shells, which indicate that it has accreted material, probably by the merger of smaller galaxies.

More detailed observations of the galaxy in HI by the Very Large Array revealed that the HI disk is in fact a ring. The observations also made it possible to measure the rotation curve of HI. The rotation curve rises quickly to a maximal velocity and then declines slowly until it flattens out at a lower velocity. This rotation curve is typical of galaxies with concentrated light distribution and could indicate that while the central part is dominated by visible mass, the outer parts are dominated by dark matter. The mass-to-light ratio is 4.3 M_{☉}/L_{☉}_{I} at one effective radius and increases to 8.5 M_{☉}/L_{☉}_{I} at 5 effective radii, where dark matter comprises at least 55 per cent of the total mass.

Observations of the central area of the galaxy by Hubble Space Telescope revealed the presence of two gaseous spiral features, extending for about 200 parsecs. The kinematics of the central area show significant deviations from circular motions and they have been interpreted as the signature of a bar which is about 540 parsecs in diameter. The bar, although too weak to be detected in visual light is considered strong enough to channel material towards the central parsecs of the nucleus. Observations by SAURON (Spectrographic Areal Unit for Research on Optical Nebulae) confirmed the presence of the inner bar, while it was noted that it is possible that a large-scale bar exists too. The current star formation activity and morphological evolution of NGC 2974 has been attributed to the large bar. A ring observation in O III images may be associated with the inner bar or a nuclear ring.

The nucleus of the galaxy has been found to be active and it has been categorised as a type 2 Seyfert galaxy. The most accepted theory for the energy source of active galactic nuclei is the presence of an accretion disk around a supermassive black hole. The mass of the black hole in the centre of NGC 2974 is estimated to be between 140 and 210 million (10^{8.23±0.09}) M_{☉} based on the stellar velocity dispersion.

== Nearby galaxies ==
NGC 2974 is the largest and brightest galaxy in the NGC 2974 group. Other members of the group include the galaxies MCG -01-25-024, UGCA 173, and UGCA 175. Other nearby galaxies include NGC 2967 and UGC 5228 with their groups.
