= Abell 70 =

Planetary nebula in the constellation Aquila

Emission nebula
- Planetary nebula
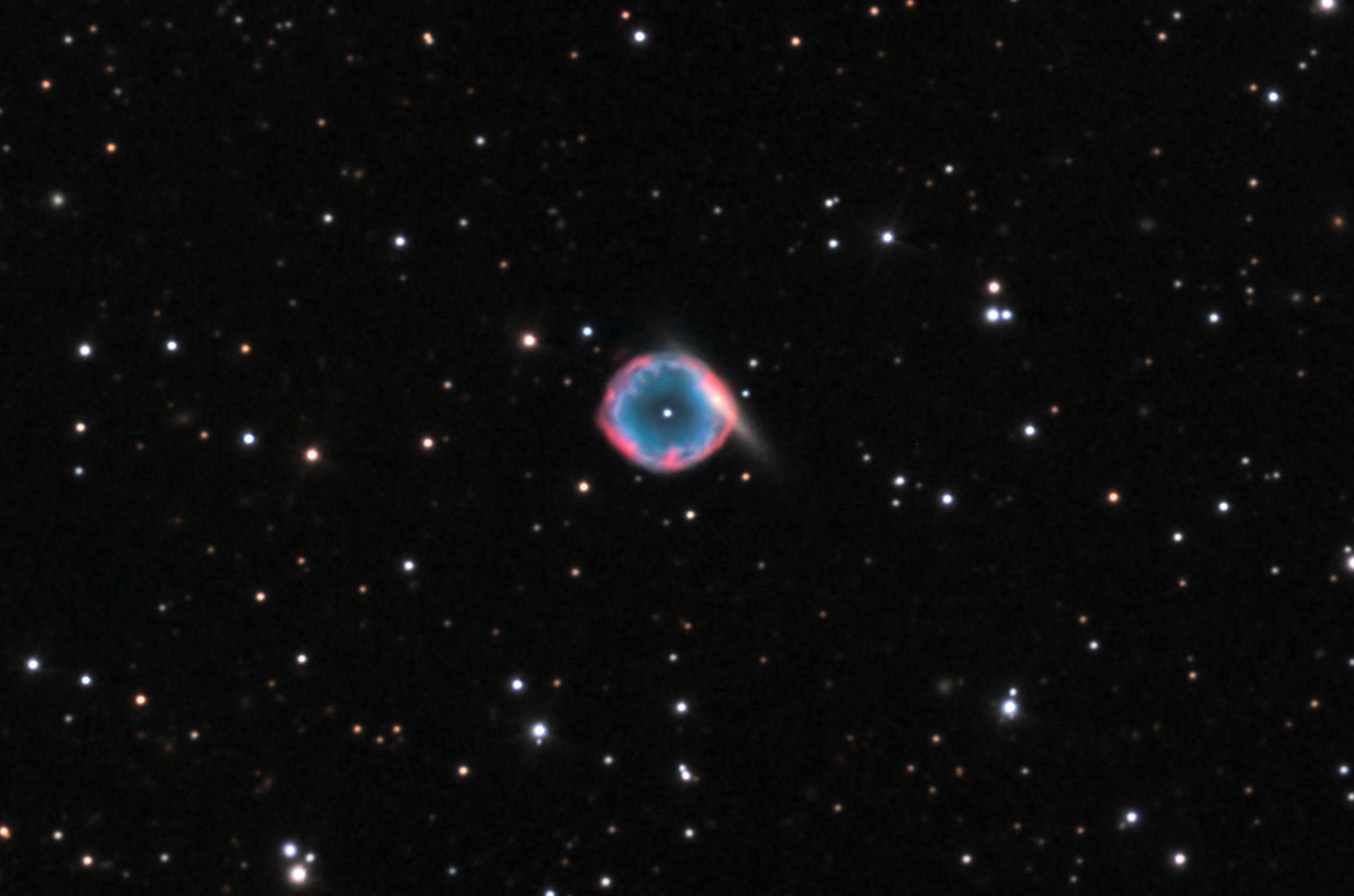
- As seen from Mount Lemmon Observatory

Observation data: J2000 epoch
- Right ascension: 20^{h} 31^{m} 33.2^{s}
- Declination: −07° 05′ 17″
- Constellation: Aquila
- Notable features: A background galaxy gives it a "diamond ring" effect
- Designations: PK 038-25.1, PN G038.1-25.4, PN A66 70

Abell 70 is a slightly elongated planetary nebula located 13,500-17,500 light years away in the constellation of Aquila. It is approaching the earth at 79 kilometers per second and expanding 38 kilometers per second. There is a galaxy named PMN J2033-0656 behind Abell 70, giving it a "diamond ring" effect.

== Composition ==
The faint OIII ring structure can be seen through a telescope. The central star of Abell 70 is a binary star system consisting of a hot white dwarf and a G-type subgiant star. The subgiant star is a barium star that rotates rapidly (with a period of about 2 days) and is variable due to starspots.

== Background galaxy ==
PMN J2033-0656

Observation data (J2000 epoch)
- Right ascension: 20^{h} 31^{m} 33.1^{s}
- Declination: −07° 05′ 01″
- Distance: 253 Mly (78 Mpc)

Characteristics
- Apparent size (V): 1.1' × 0.3'

Other designations
- 6dFGS gJ203133.1-070502, NVSS J203133-070522, 2MASX J20313312-0705014, LEDA 187663, PGC 187663

PMN J2033-0656 is an edge-on radio galaxy. Its position gives Abell 70 a diamond ring effect at its northern edge.

== See also ==
- Abell 7
- Abell 33
