= Tau1 Hydrae =

Triple star system in the constellation Hydra

Tau^{1} Hydrae
- Location of τ^{1} Hydrae (circled in red)

Observation data Epoch J2000.0 Equinox J2000.0 (ICRS)
- Constellation: Hydra
- Right ascension: 09^{h} 29^{m} 08.89655^{s}
- Declination: −02° 46′ 08.2649″
- Apparent magnitude (V): +4.59 (4.60 + 7.15)

Characteristics
- Spectral type: F6 V + ? + K0
- B−V color index: +0.411±0.015

Astrometry
Radial velocity (R_{v})	+10.85±0.28 km/s
Absolute magnitude (M_{V})	+3.28

τ^{1} Hydrae A
Proper motion (μ)	RA: +107.115 mas/yr Dec.: −29.652 mas/yr
Parallax (π)	56.2938±0.5309 mas
Distance	57.9 ± 0.5 ly (17.8 ± 0.2 pc)

τ^{1} Hydrae B
Proper motion (μ)	RA: +138.487 mas/yr Dec.: −17.371 mas/yr
Parallax (π)	55.3675±0.0638 mas
Distance	58.91 ± 0.07 ly (18.06 ± 0.02 pc)

Orbit
Period (P)	2,807±23 d
Eccentricity (e)	0.33±0.12
Periastron epoch (T)	2445260 ± 150 JD
Semi-amplitude (K_{1}) (primary)	2.98±0.39 km/s

Details

τ^{1} Hydrae A
Mass	1.20 M_{☉}
Radius	1.4 R_{☉}
Luminosity (bolometric)	3.369 L_{☉}
Surface gravity (log g)	4.12±0.14 cgs
Temperature	6,473±220 K
Metallicity [Fe/H]	−0.01 dex
Rotational velocity (v sin i)	30.4±1.5 km/s
Age	3.61 Gyr

τ^{1} Hydrae B
Mass	0.86 M_{☉}
Radius	0.81 R_{☉}
Luminosity	0.435 L_{☉}
Temperature	5,197 K

Other designations
- τ^{1} Hya, 31 Hydrae, BD−02°2901, GJ 348, HD 81997, HIP 46509, HR 3759, SAO 136895, WDS J09291-0246

Database references
SIMBAD	τ^{1} Hya AB
- τ^{1} Hya A
- τ^{1} Hya B

Tau^{1} Hydrae is a triple star system in the equatorial constellation of Hydra. Based upon the annual parallax shift of the two visible components as seen from Earth, they are located about 18 parsecs (59 ly) from the Sun. The system has a combined apparent visual magnitude of +4.59, which is bright enough to be visible to the naked eye at night.

The inner pair of stars form a single-lined spectroscopic binary with an orbital period of about 2,807 days and an eccentricity of 0.33. The visible member of the pair, component A, is a visual magnitude 4.60 F-type main sequence star with a stellar classification of F6 V. During the 1990s, it was thought to be a Gamma Doradus variable, but this was later discounted as it shows no short-term photometric variability. The star does show some long-term variability, possibly as a result of a magnetic activity cycle similar to the solar cycle.

The tertiary member, component B, is a visual magnitude 7.15 K-type star with a class of K0. It lies at a separation of 1,120 AU from the primary. As of 2012, it was positioned at an angular separation of 67.5 arc seconds along a position angle of 4°.

This star along with τ^{2} Hydrae, ι Hydrae and 33 Hydrae (A Hydrae) were traditionally known as Ukdah, Arabic for "knot". The name Ukdah is now officially applied to ι Hydrae.
