= Tau2 Hydrae =

Binary star system in the constellation Hydra

Tau^{2} Hydrae
- Location of τ^{2} Hydrae (circled in red)

Observation data Epoch J2000.0 Equinox J2000.0 (ICRS)
- Constellation: Hydra
- Right ascension: 09^{h} 31^{m} 58.92729^{s}
- Declination: −01° 11′ 04.7899″
- Apparent magnitude (V): +4.56

Characteristics
- Spectral type: A3 V
- U−B color index: +0.06
- B−V color index: +0.11
- Variable type: Suspected

Astrometry
Radial velocity (R_{v})	+3.9±0.4 km/s
Proper motion (μ)	RA: −12.60 mas/yr Dec.: −3.99 mas/yr
Parallax (π)	6.30±0.72 mas
Distance	approx. 520 ly (approx. 160 pc)
Absolute magnitude (M_{V})	−1.43

Details
Radius	4.5 R_{☉}
Luminosity	285 L_{☉}
Temperature	7,918 K
Rotational velocity (v sin i)	54.0±0.6 km/s

Other designations
- τ^{2} Hya, 32 Hydrae, BD−00°2211, HD 82446, HIP 46776, HR 3787, SAO 136932.

Database references
SIMBAD	data

Tau^{2} Hydrae is a probable astrometric binary star system in the equatorial constellation of Hydra. Based upon an annual parallax shift of 6.30 mas as seen from Earth, it is located around 520 light years from the Sun. The brighter component is visible to the naked eye with an apparent visual magnitude of +4.56.

The primary member, component A, is an A-type main sequence star with a stellar classification of A3 V. It is a suspected variable of unknown type, with an amplitude of 0.06 in visual magnitude. The star has around 4.5 times the radius of the Sun and is radiating about 285 times the solar luminosity from its photosphere at an effective temperature of 7,918 K.

This star along with τ^{1} Hydrae, ι Hydrae and 33 Hydrae (A Hydrae) were traditionally known as Ukdah, Arabic for "knot". The name Ukdah is now officially applied to ι Hydrae.
