= Messier 48 =

Open cluster in the constellation Hydra

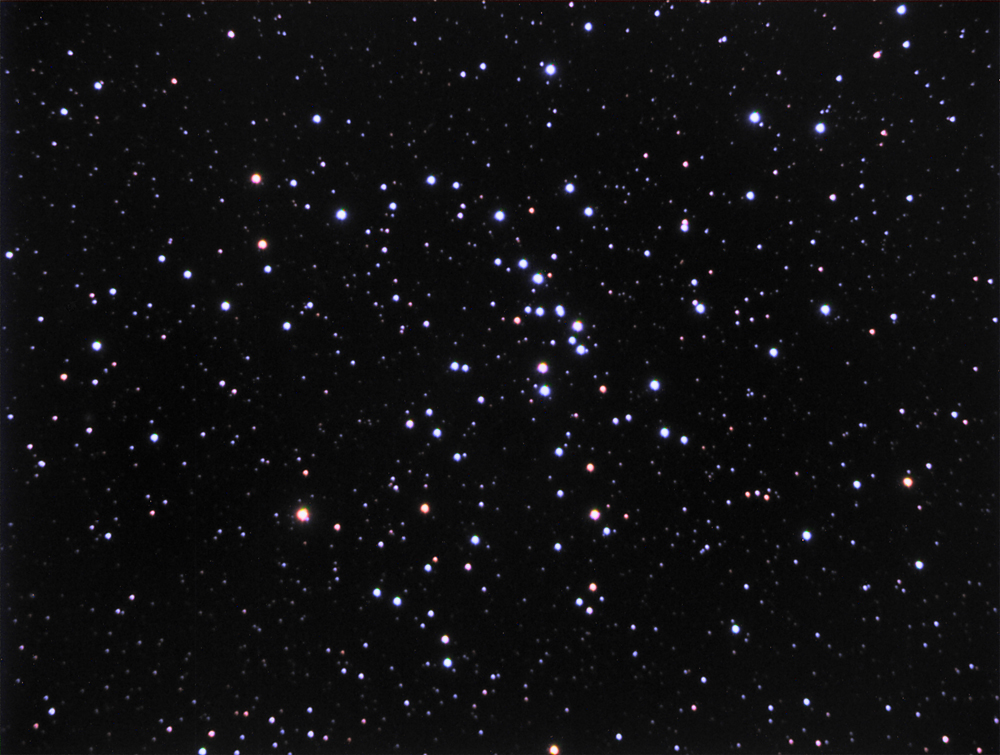
- Open cluster Messier 48 in Hydra

Observation data (J2000 epoch)
- Right ascension: 08^{h} 13^{m} 43.0^{s}
- Declination: −05° 45′ 00″
- Distance: 2,500 ly (770 pc)
- Apparent magnitude (V): 5.8
- Apparent dimensions (V): 30′

Physical characteristics
- Mass: 2,366+1,109 −755 M_{☉}
- Radius: 63 ly
- Estimated age: 450±50 Myr
- Other designations: M48, NGC 2548, Cr 179, H IV-22

Associations
- Constellation: Hydra

Messier 48 or M48, also known as NGC 2548, is an open cluster of stars in the equatorial constellation of Hydra. It sits near Hydra's westernmost limit with Monoceros, about 18° 34′ to the east and slightly south of Hydra's brightest star, Alphard. This grouping was discovered by Charles Messier in 1771, but there is no cluster precisely where Messier indicated; he made an error, as he did with M47. The value that he gave for the right ascension matches, however, his declination is off by five degrees. Credit for discovery is sometimes given instead to Caroline Herschel in 1783. Her nephew John Herschel described it as, "a superb cluster which fills the whole field; stars of 9th and 10th to the 13th magnitude – and none below, but the whole ground of the sky on which it stands is singularly dotted over with infinitely minute points".

M48 is visible to the naked eye under good atmospheric conditions. The brightest member is the star HIP 40348 at visual magnitude 8.3. The cluster is located some 2,500 light-years from the Sun. The age estimated from isochrones is 400±100 Myr, while gyrochronology age estimate is 450±50 Myr – in good agreement. This makes it intermediate in age between the Pleiades, at around 100 Myr, and the Hyades, at about 650 Myr. The metallicity of the cluster, based on the abundance of iron (Fe), is [Fe/H] = −0.063±0.007 dex, where −1 would be ten times lower than in the Sun. It is more metal-poor than the Pleiades, Hyades, and Praesepe clusters.

The cluster has a tidal radius of 63.3 ± 7.8 ly (19.4 ± 2.4 pc) with at least 438 members and a mass of 2,366 M_{☉}. The general structure of the cluster is fragmented and lumpy, which may be due to interactions with the galactic disk. The cluster is now subdivided into three groups, each of which has its own collective proper motion.

== See also ==
- List of Messier objects
