= Iota Hydrae =

Star in the constellation Hydra

- Location of Iota Hydrae (circled)

Observation data Epoch J2000.0 Equinox J2000.0 (ICRS)
- Constellation: Hydra
- Right ascension: 09^{h} 39^{m} 51.36145^{s}
- Declination: −01° 08′ 34.1135″
- Apparent magnitude (V): 3.91

Characteristics
- Evolutionary stage: probable red giant branch (Note: 36% chance of being on the horizontal branch)
- Spectral type: K2.5 III
- B−V color index: 1.32
- Variable type: Suspected

Astrometry
Radial velocity (R_{v})	+24.19±0.36 km/s
Proper motion (μ)	RA: +46.96 mas/yr Dec.: −62.39 mas/yr
Parallax (π)	12.39±0.14 mas
Distance	263 ± 3 ly (80.7 ± 0.9 pc)
Absolute magnitude (M_{V})	−0.63

Details
Mass	1.92 M_{☉}
Radius	30±0.04 R_{☉}
Luminosity	241±7 L_{☉}
Surface gravity (log g)	1.78±0.04 cgs
Temperature	4,238±22 K
Metallicity [Fe/H]	−0.06±0.05 dex
Rotational velocity (v sin i)	4.5 km/s
Age	2.47 Gyr

Other designations
- Ukdah, ι Hya, 35 Hya, BD−00°2231, FK5 1250, HD 83618, HIP 47431, HR 3845, SAO 137035

Database references
SIMBAD	data

Iota Hydrae, formally named Ukdah /ˈʌkdə/, is a star in the constellation of Hydra, about 8° to the north-northwest of Alphard (Alpha Hydrae) and just to the south of the celestial equator. Visible to the naked eye, it is a suspected variable star with an apparent visual magnitude that ranges between 3.87 and 3.91. Based upon an annual parallax shift of 12.39 mas measured during the Hipparcos mission, it is located around 263 light-years distant.

== Nomenclature ==
ι Hydrae (Latinised to Iota Hydrae, abbreviated ι Hya, Iota Hya) is the star's Bayer designation.

This star along with Tau^{1} Hydrae, Tau^{2} Hydrae and 33 Hydrae (A Hydrae), were Ptolemy's Καμπή (Kampē); but Kazwini knew them as عقدة ʽuqdah (or ʽuḳdah) "knot". According to a 1971 NASA memorandum, Ukdah was the name of an asterism of four stars: Tau^{1} Hydrae as Uḳdah I, Tau^{2} Hydrae as Uḳdah II, 33 Hydrae as Uḳdah III and Iota Hydrae as Uḳdah IV. In 2016, the IAU organized a Working Group on Star Names (WGSN) to catalog and standardize proper names for stars. The WGSN approved the name Ukdah for Iota Hydrae on 1 June 2018 and it is now so included in the List of IAU-approved Star Names.

In Chinese, 星宿 (Xīng Sù), meaning Star (asterism), refers to an asterism consisting of ι Hydrae, Alphard, τ^{1} Hydrae, τ^{2} Hydrae, 26 Hydrae, 27 Hydrae, HD 82477 and HD 82428. Consequently, ι Hydrae is known as 星宿四 (Xīng Sù sì, English: the Fourth Star of Star). R. H. Allen's 1899 book Star Names claimed the Chinese name Ping Sing, translated as "a Tranquil Star", for ι Hydrae, but this name belongs instead to an asterism of γ Hydrae and π Hydrae.

== Properties ==
This is an evolved K-type giant star with a stellar classification of K2.5 III. It is a Barium star, which means that, for a giant star, it displays unusually strong absorption lines of singly-ionized barium and strontium. Iota Hydrae has nearly twice the mass of the Sun and has expanded to 30 times the Sun's radius. It is around 2.5 billion years old and is spinning with a leisurely projected rotational velocity of 4.5 km/s. It may be a member of the Wolf 630 moving group of stars that share a common trajectory through space.
