= Messier 68 =

Globular cluster in the constellation Hydra

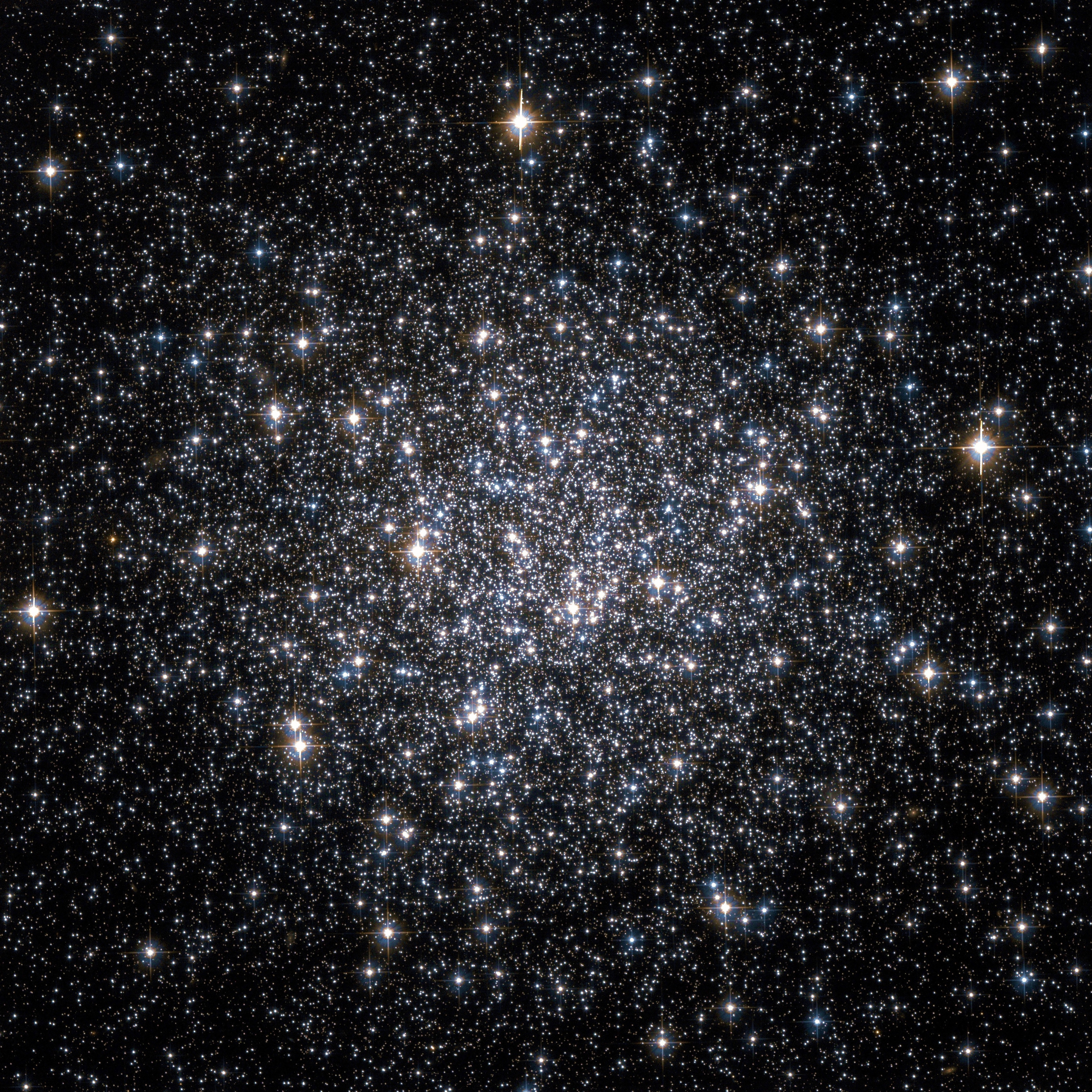
- M68 from Hubble Space Telescope in 2008; 3.32′ view

Observation data (J2000 epoch)
- Class: X
- Constellation: Hydra
- Right ascension: 12^{h} 39^{m} 27.98^{s}
- Declination: –26° 44′ 38.6″
- Distance: 33.6 kly (10.3 kpc)
- Apparent magnitude (V): 7.8
- Apparent dimensions (V): 11.0′

Physical characteristics
- Mass: 2.23×10^{5} M_{☉}
- Radius: 53.5 ly
- Metallicity: [Fe/H] = –2.23 dex
- Estimated age: 11.2 Gyr
- Notable features: Relatively metal poor.
- Other designations: M68, NGC 4590, GCl 20

Messier 68 (also known as M68 or NGC 4590) is a globular cluster found in the east south-east of Hydra, away from its precisely equatorial part. It was discovered by Charles Messier in 1780. William Herschel described it as "a beautiful cluster of stars, extremely rich, and so compressed that most of the stars are blended together". His son John noted that it was "all clearly resolved into stars of 12th magnitude, very loose and ragged at the borders".

M68 is centred about 33,600 light-years away from Earth. It is orbiting our galaxy's galactic bulge with a great eccentricity of 0.5. This takes it to 100,000 light years from the center. It is one of the most metal-poor globular clusters, which means it has a paucity of elements other than hydrogen and helium. The cluster may be undergoing core-collapse, and it displays signs of being in rotation. The cluster may have been acquired in its gravitational tie to the Milky Way through accretion from a satellite galaxy.

As of 2015, 50 variable stars have been identified in this cluster; the first 28 being identified as early as 1919–20 by American astronomer Harlow Shapley. Most of the variables are of type RR Lyrae, or periodic variables. Six of the variables are of the SX Phoenicis variety, which display short pulsating behavior.

== Gallery ==
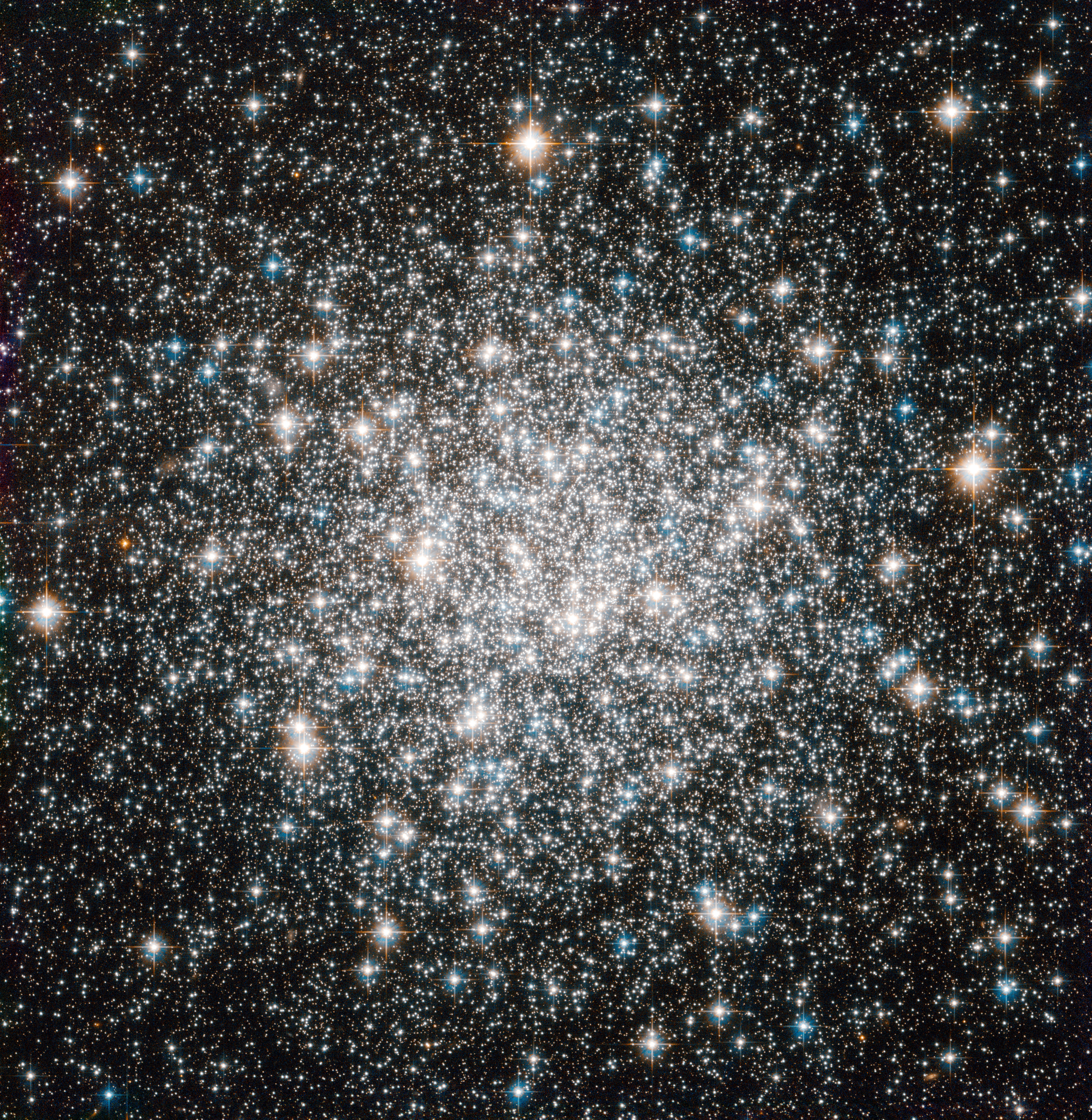
A 2012 view of M68 from the Wide Field Camera of Hubble's Advanced Camera for Surveys

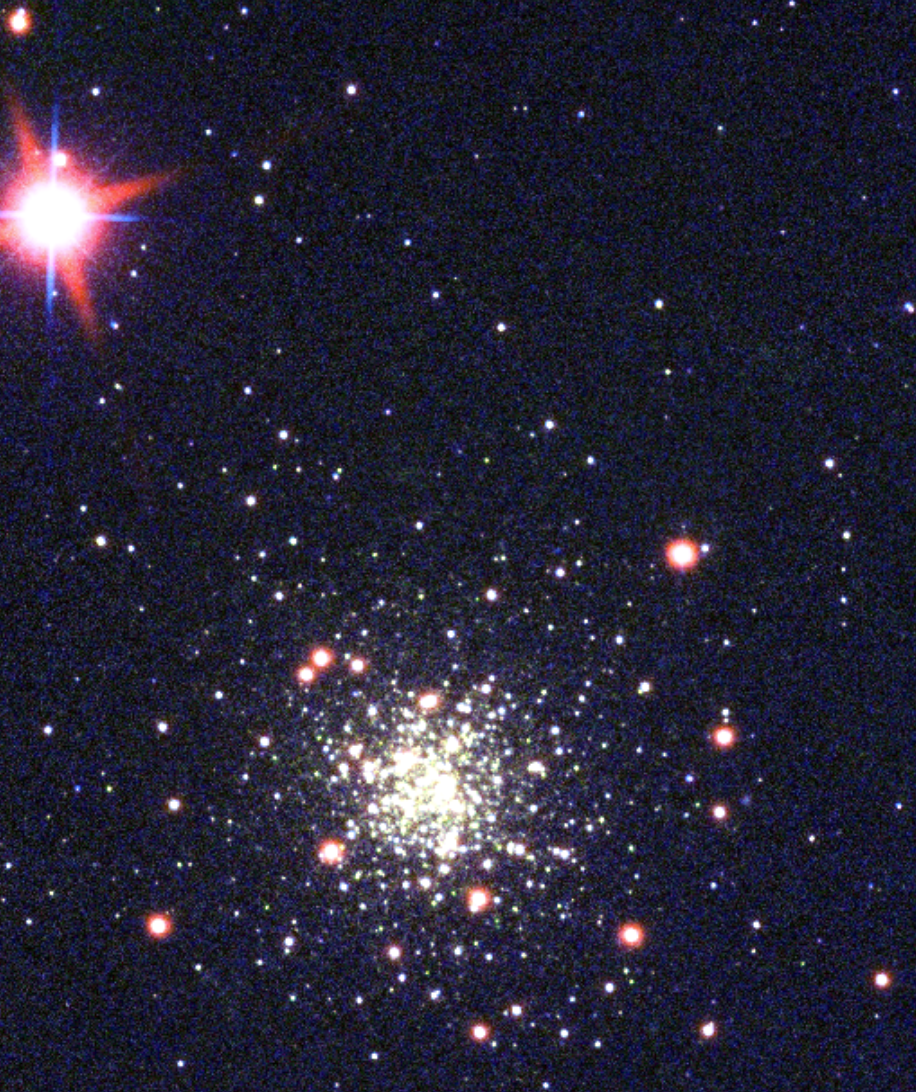
NGC 4590 imaged using CTIO's PROMPT-6 telescope. The RGB filters were used, 10 second exposure on each. Additionally, a layer of WISE 12 micron data from SkyViewer was layered on top.

== See also ==
- List of Messier objects
