= NGC 3018 =

Galaxy in Sextans constellation

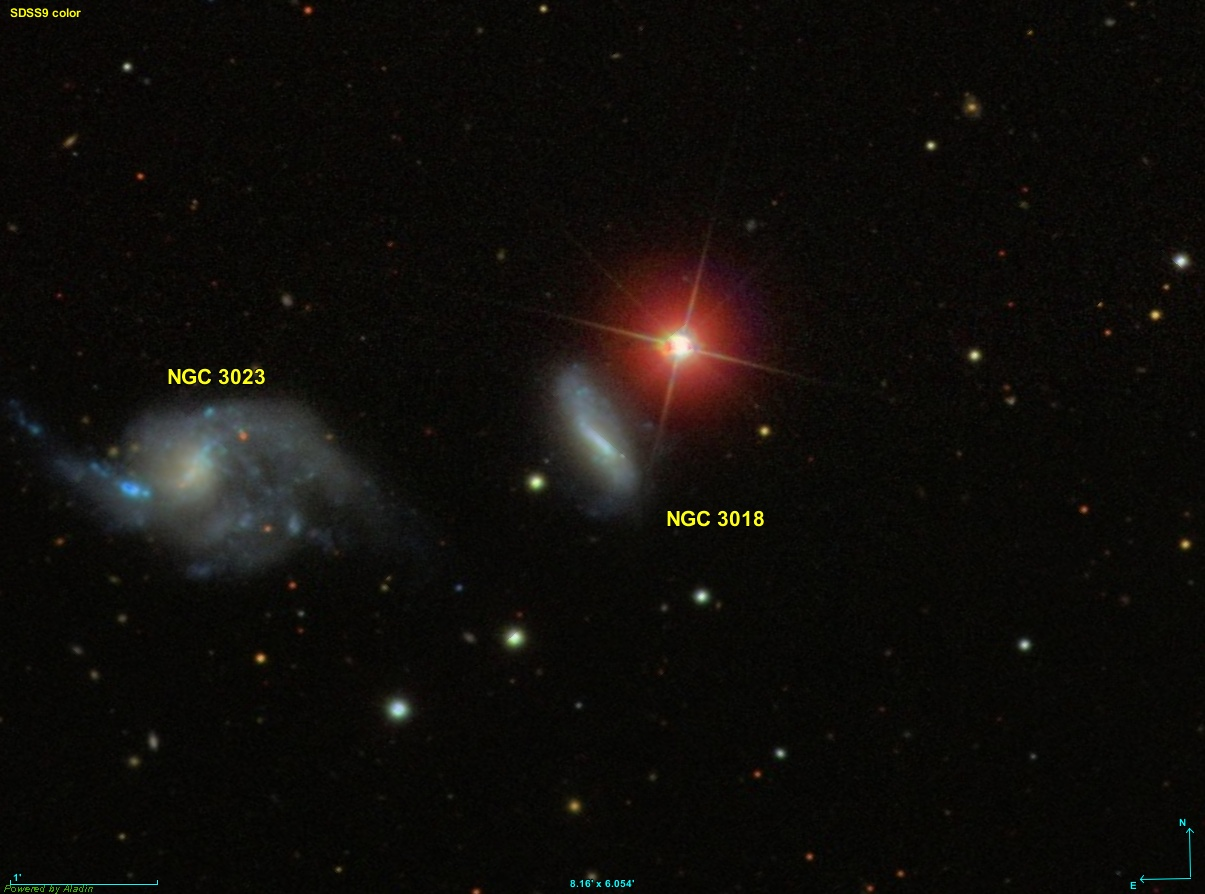
- Image of NGC 3018 with it neighbor NGC 3023

Observation data (J2000 epoch)
- Constellation: Sextans
- Right ascension: 09^{h} 49^{m} 41.4650^{s}
- Declination: +00° 37′ 16.954″
- Redshift: 0.006214 ± 0.000002
- Heliocentric radial velocity: 1863 ± 6 km/s
- Galactocentric velocity: 1713 ± 8 km/s
- Distance: 106.2 ± 7.5 Mly (32.55 ± 2.31 Mpc)
- Apparent magnitude (V): 14.3

Characteristics
- Type: SB(s)b pec?
- Size: ~38,700 ly (11.88 kpc) (estimated)

Other designations
- 2MASX J09494143+0037163, UGC 5265, LEDA 28258, PGC 28258

NGC 3018 (also known as PGC 28258) is a barred spiral galaxy in the constellation Sextans. It was discovered on March 10, 1880 by Édouard Stephan and also observed on March 10, 1886 by Lewis Swift.

== NGC 2967 group ==
NGC 3018 is part of the NGC 2967 Group, which includes at least eight other galaxiesUGC 5228, UGC 5238, UGC 5242, NGC 2967, NGC 3023, MCG 0-25-24, UGC 5224 and UGC 5249.

== See also ==
- List of NGC objects (3001-4000)
- List of NGC objects
