= Gamma Hydrae =

Star in the constellation Hydra

γ Hydrae
- Location of γ Hydrae (circled)

Observation data Epoch J2000.0 Equinox ICRS
- Constellation: Hydra
- Right ascension: 13^{h} 18^{m} 55.29719^{s}
- Declination: −23° 10′ 17.4514″
- Apparent magnitude (V): +2.993

Characteristics
- Evolutionary stage: horizontal branch
- Spectral type: G8 III
- U−B color index: +0.645
- B−V color index: +0.920

Astrometry
Radial velocity (R_{v})	−5.4 km/s
Proper motion (μ)	RA: +68.99 mas/yr Dec.: −41.85 mas/yr
Parallax (π)	24.37±0.15 mas
Distance	133.8 ± 0.8 ly (41.0 ± 0.3 pc)
Absolute magnitude (M_{V})	−0.15

Orbit
Primary	A
Name	B
Semi-major axis (a)	67.5±0.6 or 159±7 AU

Details

A
Mass	2.90±0.29 M_{☉}
Radius	12.47 ± 0.63 (Note: Calculated, using the Stefan-Boltzmann law and the star's effective temperature and luminosity, with respect to the solar nominal effective temperature of 5,772 K: $$\sqrt{\biggl(\frac{5,772}{5,127} \biggr)^4 \cdot 10^{1.986}} = 12.5\ R_\odot.$$) R_{☉}
Luminosity	96.8+9.1 −8.3 L_{☉}
Surface gravity (log g)	2.94±0.05 cgs
Temperature	5,127±30 K
Metallicity [Fe/H]	+0.02±0.02 dex
Rotational velocity (v sin i)	8 km/s
Age	372 Myr

B
Mass	0.61+0.12 −0.14 M_{☉}

Other designations
- Naga, γ Hya, 46 Hya, NSV 6180, BD−22 3554, FK5 495, HD 115659, HIP 64962, HR 5020, SAO 181543

Database references
SIMBAD	data

Gamma Hydrae, Latinized from γ Hydrae formally named Naga, is a binary star in the equatorial constellation of Hydra. It has an apparent visual magnitude of 3.0, placing it second in brightness among the members of this generally faint constellation. Based upon parallax measurements made during the Hipparcos mission, this star is at a distance of around 133.8 light-years (41.0 parsecs) from Earth.

== Nomenclature ==
Gamma Hydrae (Latinized from γ Hydrae, abbreviated γ Hya) is the star's Bayer designation.

In Southeast Asian cultures, particularly in Bali (Indonesia), the constellation Hydra is seen as a nāga (Sanskrit नाग, serpent or dragon). In Japanese, naga coincidentally means "long", which fits the image of the serpent in the sky. The IAU Working Group on Star Names approved the name Naga for Gamma Hydrae A (which marks the snake's tail) on 22 February 2026.

In Chinese astronomy, γ Hydrae forms with π Hydrae the asterism Ping (平), representing a judge. The Chinese name for γ Hydrae itself is Ping yī (平一), the first star of Ping. R. H. Allen's 1899 book Star Names instead claimed the Chinese name Ping Sing, translated as "a Tranquil Star", for ι Hydrae (Ukdah).

== Characteristics ==
The stellar spectrum of the primary matches a stellar classification of G8 III, with the luminosity class of III indicating it has evolved into a giant star after exhausting the supply of hydrogen at its core. It has nearly three times the mass of the Sun and 12.5 times the Sun's radius. The star is radiating 97 times the Sun's luminosity from its outer atmosphere at an effective temperature of 5,127 K. This heat gives it the yellow glow of a K-type star. Despite having reached an advanced stage in its evolution, it is considerably younger than the Sun with an age of around 372 million years. This is because higher mass stars consume their nuclear fuel at a more rapid rate.

The secondary component, named Gamma Hydrae B, shares a common proper motion with the primary star. Radial velocity observations confirmed it to be physically bound to Gamma Hydrae A. It has around 60% the mass of the Sun and is located at 1.6" from the primary. The physical separation is either 67.5 or 159 astronomical units.

== In culture ==
γ Hya appears on the flag of Brazil, symbolising the state of Acre.
