= Pi Hydrae =

Star in the constellation Hydra

- Location of π Hydra (circled)

Observation data Epoch J2000 Equinox ICRS
- Constellation: Hydra
- Right ascension: 14^{h} 06^{m} 22.29749^{s}
- Declination: −26° 40′ 56.5024″
- Apparent magnitude (V): 3.25

Characteristics
- Evolutionary stage: horizontal branch
- Spectral type: K1 III–IV or K2-III Fe-0.5
- U−B color index: +1.040
- B−V color index: +1.120

Astrometry
| Radial velocity (R_{v}) | +26.7 km/s |
| Proper motion (μ) | RA: +43.70 mas/yr Dec.: −141.18 mas/yr |
| Parallax (π) | 32.30±0.16 mas |
| Distance | 101.0 ± 0.5 ly (31.0 ± 0.2 pc) |
| Absolute magnitude (M_{V}) | 0.79 |

Details
| Mass | 1.40±0.21 M_{☉} |
| Radius | 12.49±0.49 R_{☉} |
| Luminosity | 60.8±2.6 L_{☉} |
| Surface gravity (log g) | 2.40±0.11 cgs |
| Temperature | 4,565±75 K |
| Metallicity [Fe/H] | −0.16±0.10 dex |
| Rotational velocity (v sin i) | 2.25 km/s |
| Age | 6.29±3.05 Gyr |

Other designations
- π Hya, Pi Hya, 49 Hydrae, CPD−26°5170, FK5 519, HD 123123, HIP 68895, HR 5287, SAO 182244

Database references
| SIMBAD | data |

Pi Hydrae, Latinized from π Hydrae, is a star in the constellation Hydra with an apparent visual magnitude of 3.3, making it visible to the naked eye. Parallax measurements put this star at a distance of about 101 light-years (31 parsecs) from the Earth.

The spectrum of this star shows it to have a stellar classification of K1 III-IV, with the luminosity class of 'III-IV' suggesting it is in an evolutionary transition stage somewhere between a subgiant and a giant star. It has a low projected rotational velocity of 2.25 km s^{−1}. Pi Hydrae is radiating 61 times the Sun's luminosity from its outer envelope with an effective temperature of 4,565 K, giving it the orange hue of a K-type star.

Pi Hydrae is a type of giant known as a cyanogen-weak star, which means that its spectrum displays weak absorption lines of CN^{−} relative to the metallicity. (The last is a term astronomers use when describing the abundance of elements other than hydrogen and helium.) Otherwise, it appears to be a normal star of its evolutionary class, having undergone first dredge-up of nuclear fusion by-products onto its surface layers.

In Chinese astronomy, π Hydrae forms with γ Hydrae the asterism Ping (平), representing a judge. The Chinese name for π Hydrae itself is Ping èr (平二), the second star of Ping. R. H. Allen's 1899 book Star Names instead claimed the Chinese name Ping Sing, translated as "a Tranquil Star", for ι Hydrae (Ukdah).
