= NGC 2865 =

Galaxy in the constellation Hydra

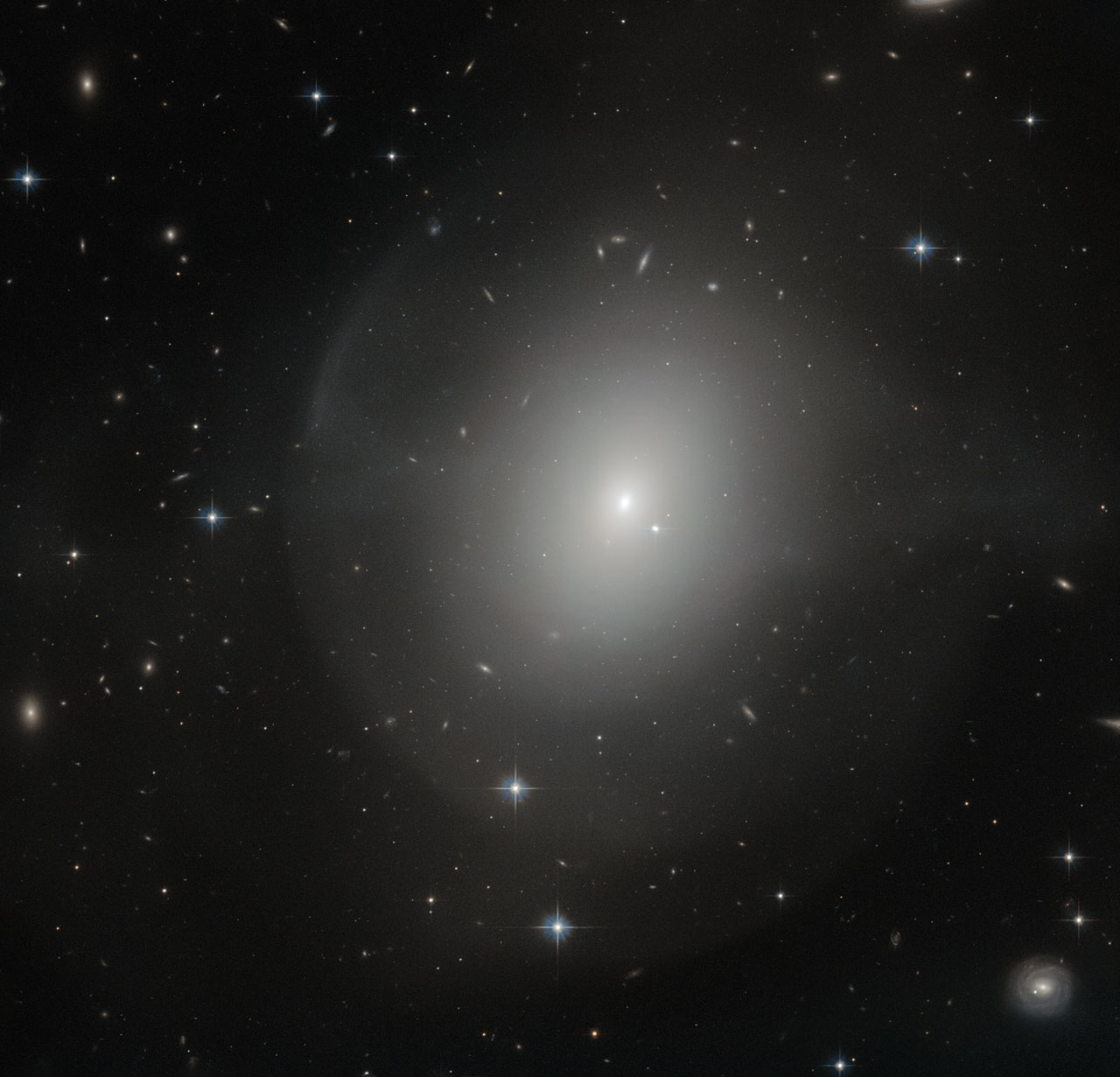
- HST image of NGC 2865

Observation data (J2000 epoch)
- Constellation: Hydra
- Right ascension: 09^{h} 23^{m} 30.205^{s}
- Declination: −23° 09′ 41.37″
- Distance: 110 Mly (35 Mpc)h^{−1}_{0.73}
- Apparent magnitude (V): 11.43
- Apparent magnitude (B): 12.18

Characteristics
- Type: E3-4

Other designations
- NGC 2865, ESO 498-1, 2MASX J09233020-2309413, PGC 26601

NGC 2865 is an isolated elliptical galaxy in the equatorial constellation of Hydra. The core region of the galaxy shows a kinematically distinct component showing indications of a recent accretion or merger event that led to a burst of star formation around the nucleus. Observational constraints require this to have occurred within the last 100–400 million years, with the merger most likely being an Sb or Sc-class spiral galaxy.

NGC 2865 displays chaotic shell features that are likely the result of an interaction. These shells provide ~11–22% of the galaxy's total luminosity and are generally more blue (younger) than the main galaxy. There is a loop to the northwest and a tail to the southeast of the galaxy, with both being typical of galaxy merger events. Seven HII regions have been identified in the tidal tails, with associated populations of young stars. A ring of neutral hydrogen surrounds the galaxy.

Although there are no nearby galaxies of comparable luminosity, there are a pair of fainter gas-rich galaxies in the vicinity. These lie at angular separations of 6 arcminutes and 9 arcminutes, corresponding to projected separations of 1.0 kpc and 1.5 kpc.

== Supernova ==
One supernova has been observed in NGC 2865:

- SN 2016gwl (Type Ia, mag. 15.95), was discovered by Gaia Photometric Science Alerts on 2 October 2016.
