= Abell 33 =

Planetary nebula in the constellation Hydra

Emission nebula
- Planetary nebula
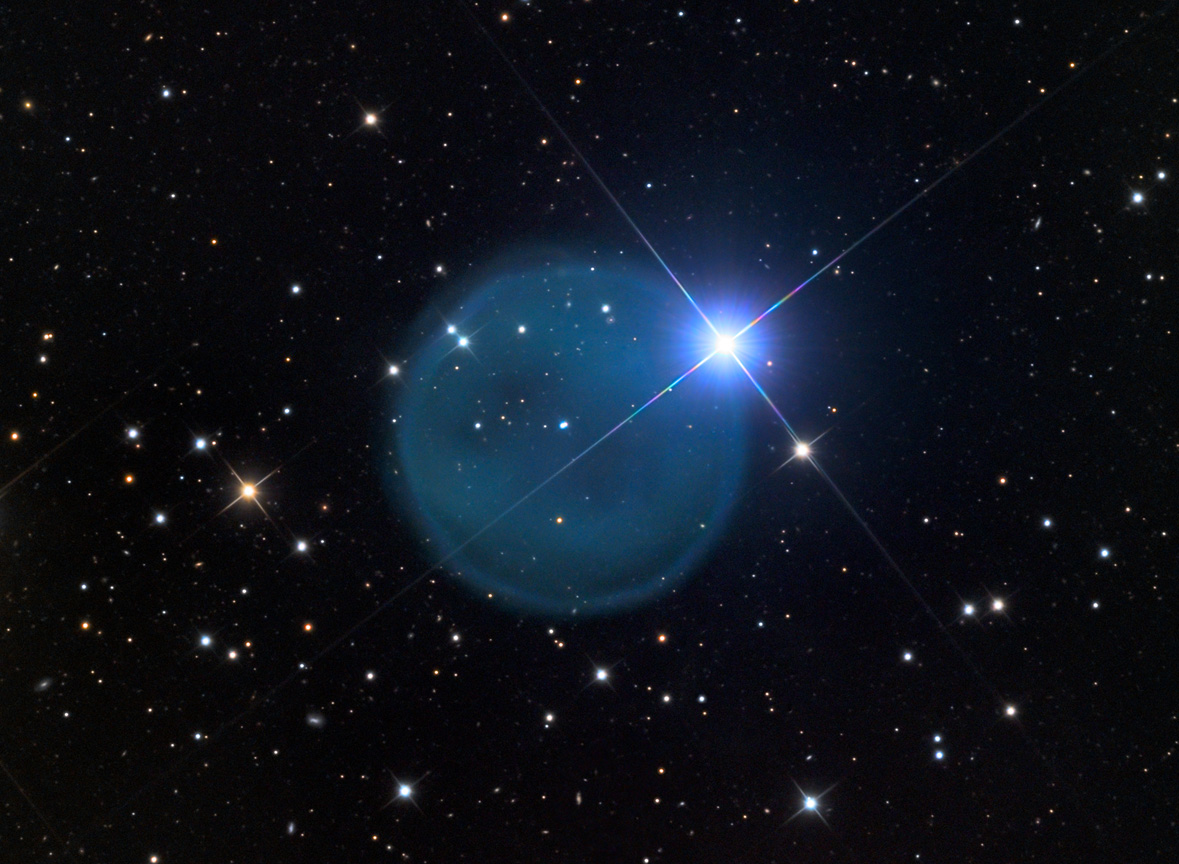
- The Abell 33 nebula as seen from Mount Lemmon Observatory

Observation data: J2000 epoch
- Right ascension: 09^{h} 39^{m} 09.2^{s}
- Declination: −02° 48′ 35″
- Distance: 2.7 kly (0.83 kpc) ly
- Apparent magnitude (V): +12.9
- Constellation: Hydra
- Notable features: Foreground star gives it a "diamond ring" effect
- Designations: PNG 238.0+34.8, PK 238+34.1, ARO 65

Abell 33 (Also called A33 or the Diamond ring nebula) is a faint spherical planetary nebula located 2700 light years away in the constellation of Hydra. It lies just behind the star HD 83535 which has no relation to the nebula. The star HD 83535 is also responsible for the "diamond ring" effect seen in the photograph.

The nebula gets its coloration from the O III emissions (doubly ionized oxygen). The nebula is faint making it difficult to be seen using a telescope. The spherical shape of Abell 33 is mainly caused by its central star not having much of a spin. The nebula shares similar morphology to another nebula with the same spherical shape, the Owl Nebula (M 97), but is much darker than the Owl Nebula.

There is also a galaxy cluster known as Abell 33, because there are two Abell astronomical catalogs, one for planetary nebulae (Abell Catalog of Planetary Nebulae) and one for galaxy clusters (Abell catalogue).
