= NGC 2967 =

Galaxy in the constellation Sextans

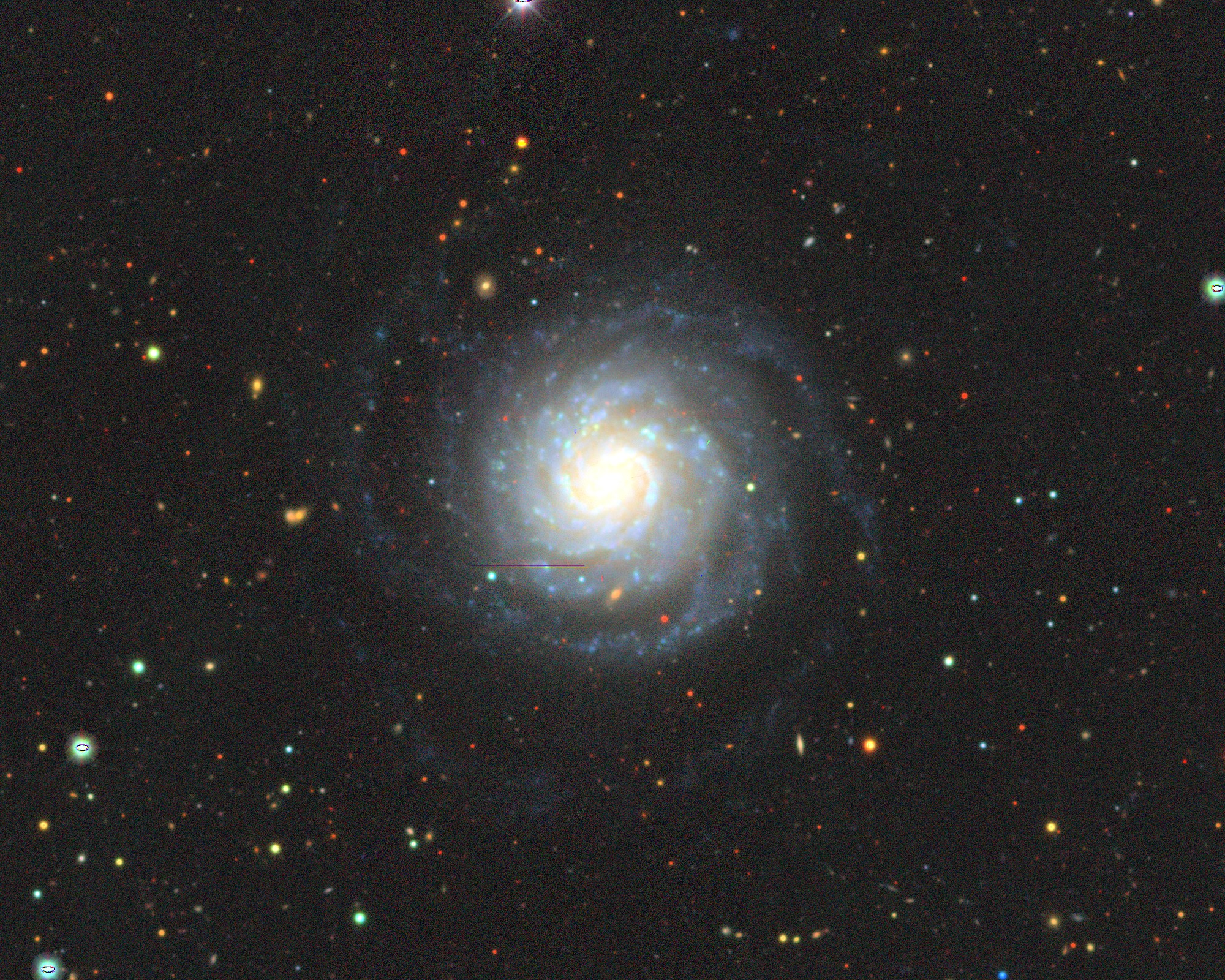
- NGC 2967 imaged by Legacy Surveys

Observation data (J2000 epoch)
- Constellation: Sextans
- Right ascension: 09^{h} 42^{m} 03.3401^{s}
- Declination: +00° 20′ 10.837″
- Redshift: 0.006264±0.00000700
- Heliocentric radial velocity: 1,878±2 km/s
- Distance: 76.52 ± 6.16 Mly (23.460 ± 1.889 Mpc)
- Group or cluster: NGC 2967 group (LGG 182)
- Apparent magnitude (V): 12.30

Characteristics
- Type: SA(s)c
- Size: ~70,400 ly (21.58 kpc) (estimated)
- Apparent size (V): 3.0′ × 2.8′

Other designations
- IRAS 09394+0033, 2MASS J09420330+0020113, UGC 5180, MCG +00-25-007, PGC 27723, CGCG 007-020

NGC 2967 is a spiral galaxy in the constellation of Sextans. Its velocity with respect to the cosmic microwave background is 2,218±24 km/s, which corresponds to a Hubble distance of 106.7 ± 7.6 Mly (32.71 ± 2.32 Mpc). However, five non-redshift measurements give a closer mean distance of 76.52 ± 6.16 Mly (23.460 ± 1.889 Mpc). It was discovered by German-British astronomer William Herschel on 20 December 1784.

== NGC 2967 group ==
NGC 2967 is a member of a group of galaxies named after it. The NGC 2967 group (also known as LGG 182) has nine galaxies, including NGC 3018, NGC 3023, UGC 5228, UGC 5238, UGC 5242, UGC 5224, UGC 5249, and UGCA 186.

== Supernova ==
One supernova has been observed in NGC 2967: SN 2010fz (Type Ia, mag. 15.8) was discovered by Berto Monard on 9 July 2010.

== See also ==
- List of NGC objects (2001–3000)
