= Abell 7 =

Planetary nebula in the constellation Lepus

Emission nebula
- Planetary nebula
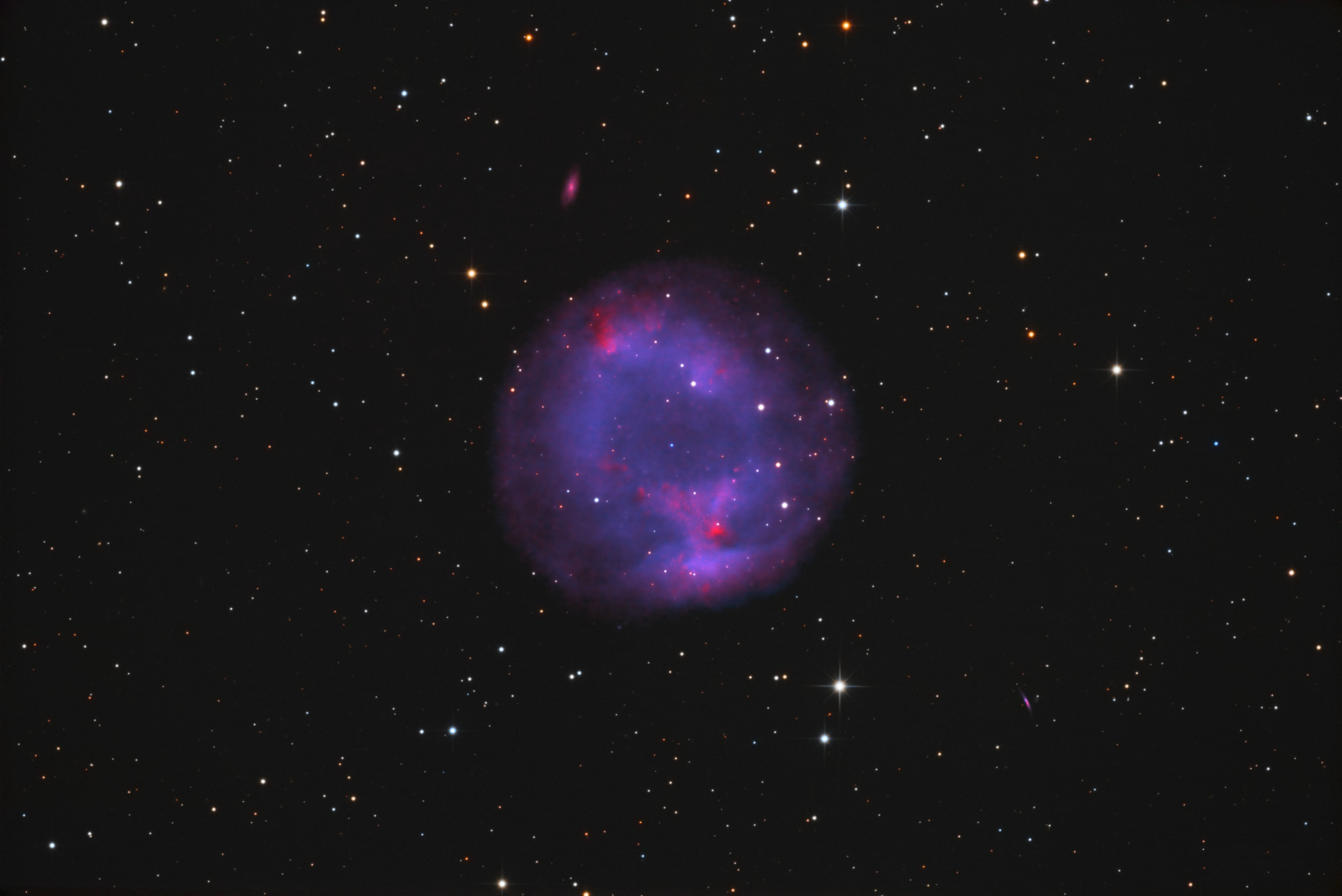

Observation data: J2000 epoch
- Right ascension: 05^{h} 03^{m} 07.53^{s}
- Declination: −15° 36′ 22.7″
- Distance: 1.8 kly (0.55 kpc) ly
- Apparent magnitude (V): Integrated: 12.2–14.3; Central star: 15.4
- Apparent dimensions (V): 12.733′ × 12.733′
- Constellation: Lepus (constellation)

Physical characteristics
- Radius: 8 ly (2.5 pc) ly
- Notable features: Simple spherical shape
- Designations: PK 215-30.1, PN G 215.5-30.8

Abell 7 is a faint planetary nebula located 1800 light-years away in the constellation of Lepus. It has a generally spherical shape about 8 light-years in diameter. Within the sphere are complex details that are brought out by narrowband filters. Abell 7 is estimated to be only 20,000 years old, but the central star, a fading white dwarf, is estimated to be some 10 billion years old.
