= Owl Nebula =

Planetary nebula in the constellation Ursa Major

Messier 97, Owl Nebula
Emission nebula
- Planetary nebula
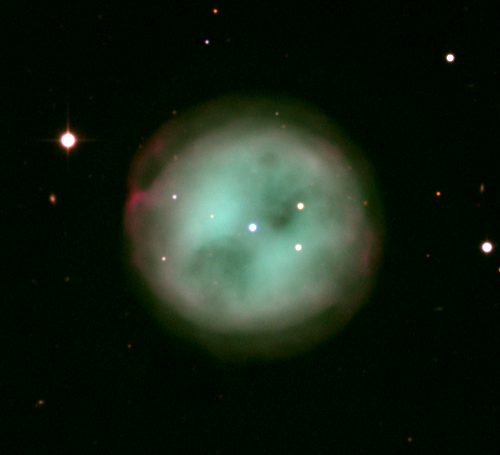
- Owl Nebula Messier 97

Observation data: J2000.0 epoch
- Right ascension: 11^{h} 14^{m} 47.734^{s}
- Declination: +55° 01′ 08.50″
- Distance: 2,030 ly (621 pc); 2,800 ly (870 pc) ly
- Apparent magnitude (V): 9.9
- Apparent dimensions (V): 3′.4 × 3′.3
- Constellation: Ursa Major

Physical characteristics
- Radius: 0.91 ly (0.28 pc) ly
- Notable features: Owl-like "eyes" visible through larger telescopes
- Designations: M97, NGC 3587, PN G148.4+57.0

The Owl Nebula (also known as Messier 97, M97 or NGC 3587) is a planetary nebula approximately 2,030 light years away in the constellation Ursa Major. Estimated to be about 8,000 years old, it is approximately circular in cross-section with a faint internal structure. It was formed from the outflow of material from the stellar wind of the central star as it evolved along the asymptotic giant branch. The nebula is arranged in three concentric shells, with the outermost shell being about 20–30% larger than the inner shell. The owl-like appearance of the nebula is the result of an inner shell that is not circularly symmetric, but instead forms a barrel-like structure aligned at an angle of 45° to the line of sight.

The nebula holds about 0.13 solar masses (M_{☉}) of matter, including hydrogen, helium, nitrogen, oxygen, and sulfur; all with a density of less than 100 particles per cubic centimeter. Its outer radius is around 0.91 ly (0.28 pc) and it is expanding with velocities in the range of 27–39 km/s into the surrounding interstellar medium.

The 14th magnitude central star has passed the turning point in its evolution and is condensing to form a white dwarf. It has 55–60% of solar mass, has 41 to 148 times solar luminosity (L_{☉}), and has an effective temperature of 123,000 K. The star has been successfully resolved by the Spitzer Space Telescope as a point source that does not show the infrared excess characteristic of a circumstellar disk.

== History ==
The Owl Nebula was discovered by French astronomer Pierre Méchain on February 16, 1781. Pierre Méchain was Charles Messier's observing colleague, and the nebula was observed by Messier himself a few weeks following the initial sighting. Thus, the object was named Messier 97, and included in his catalog on March 24, 1781. Of the object, he noted:

Nebula in the great Bear, near Beta: It is difficult to see, reports M. Méchain, especially when one illuminates the micrometer wires: its light is faint, without a star. M. Méchain saw it the first time on Feb 16, 1781, & the position is that given by him. Near this nebula he has seen another one, [the position of] which has not yet been determined [Messier 108], and also a third which is near Gamma of the Great Bear [Messier 109]. (diam. 2′).

In 1844, Admiral William H. Smyth classified the object as a planetary nebula. When William Parsons, 3rd Earl of Rosse, observed the nebula in Ireland in 1848, his hand-drawn illustration resembled an owl's head. In his notes, the object was described as "Two stars considerably apart in the central region, dark penumbra round each spiral arrangement, with stars as apparent centres of attraction. Stars sparkling in it; resolvable." It has been known as the Owl Nebula ever since. More recent developments in the late 1900s include the discovery of a giant red halo of wind extended around its inner shells, and the mapping of the nebula's structure.

== Observing ==
Although the Owl Nebula can not be seen with the naked eye, a faint image of it can be observed under remarkably good conditions with a small telescope or 20×80 binoculars. To make out the nebula's more distinctive owl like eye features, a telescope with an aperture 10" or better is required. To locate the nebula in the night sky, look to the southwest corner of the Big Dipper's bowl, marked by the star Beta Ursae Majoris. From there, M97 lies just over 2.5 degrees in the southeast direction towards the star positioned opposite Beta Ursae Majoris in the other bottom corner of the Big Dippers Bowl, Gamma Ursae Majoris; which marks the constellations southwest corner. M97, together with Alpha Ursae Majoris, point the way to Polaris.

== Gallery ==
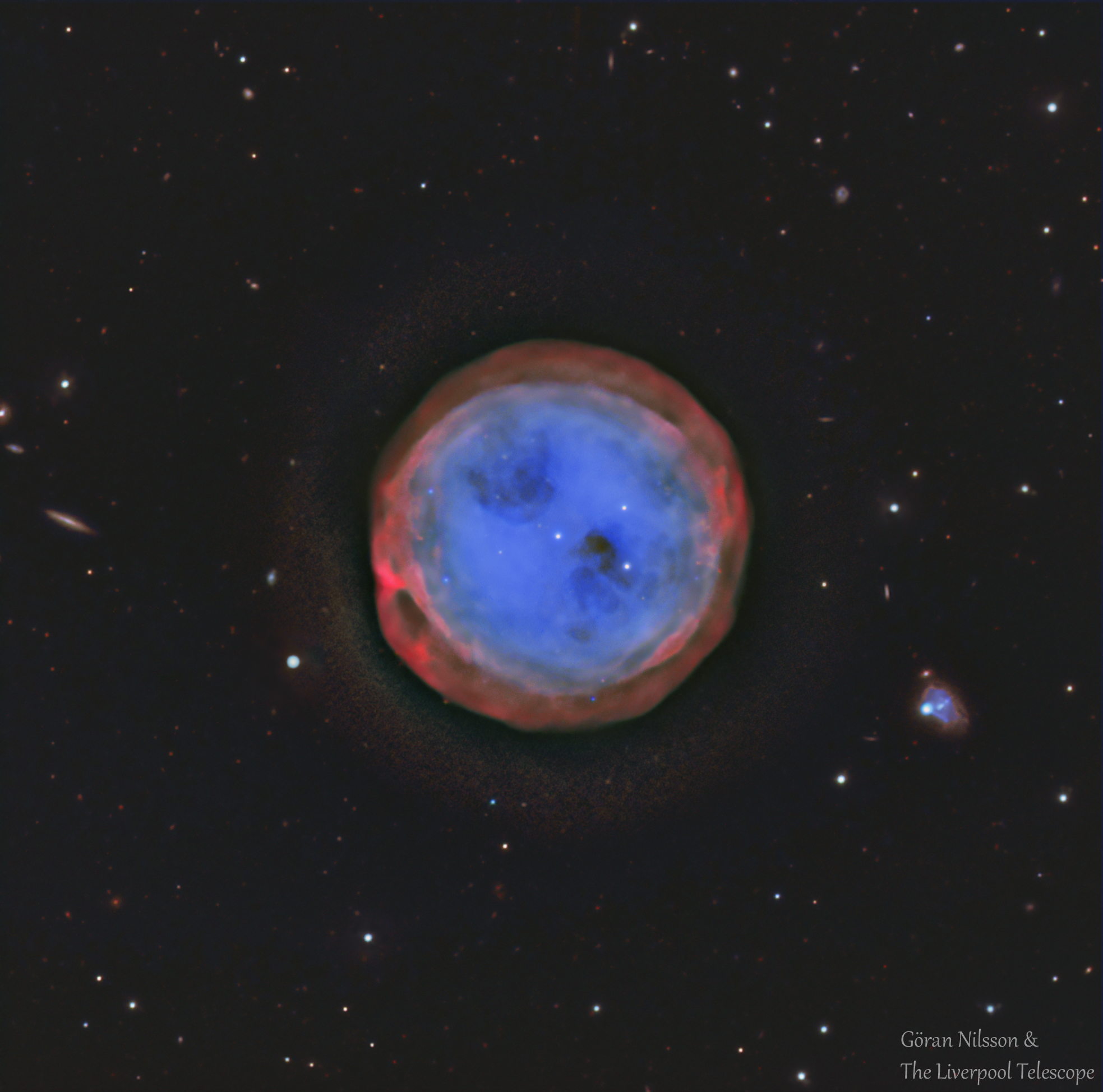
HaRGB image of the Owl Nebula M97 from the Liverpool Telescope

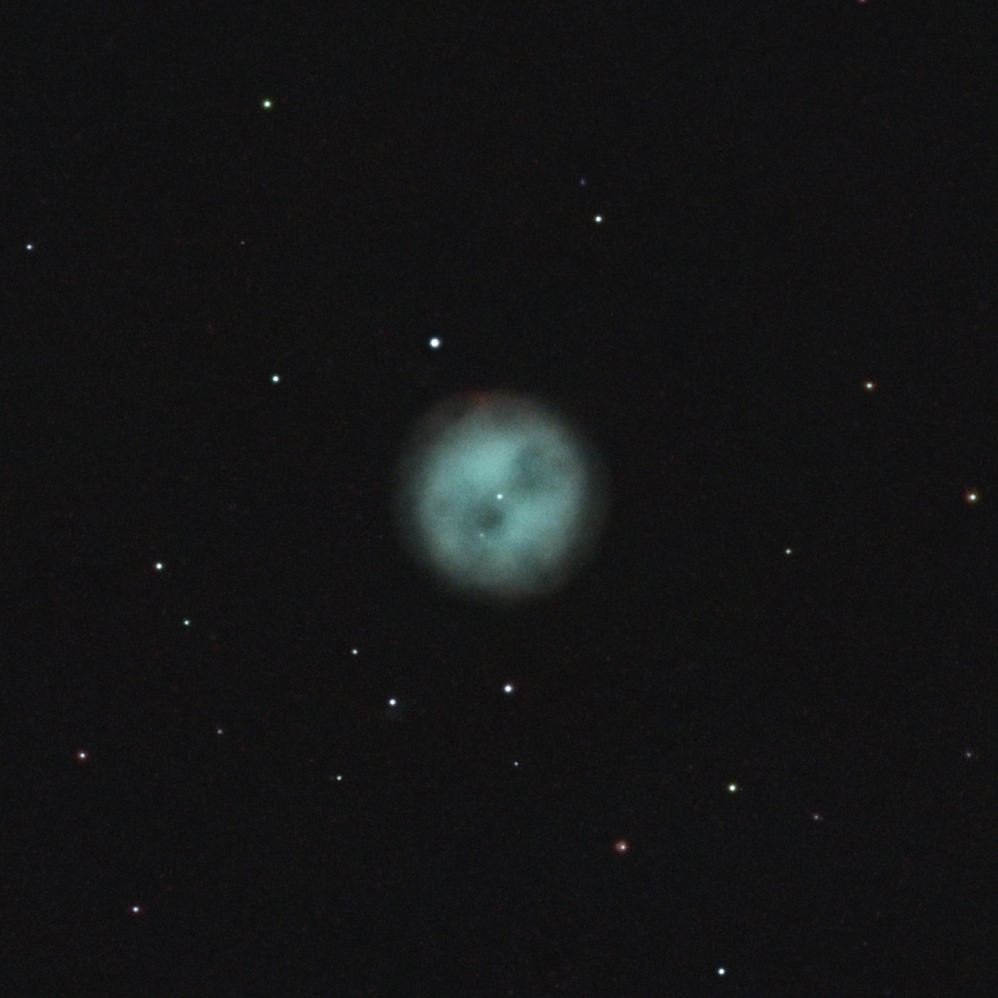
The Owl Nebula in amateur telescope

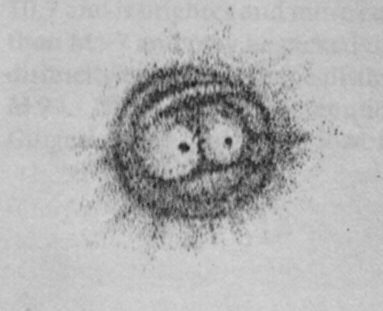
Drawing of the Owl Nebula (M97) by Lord Rosse, who gave the name to the planetary nebula. Source: seds.org

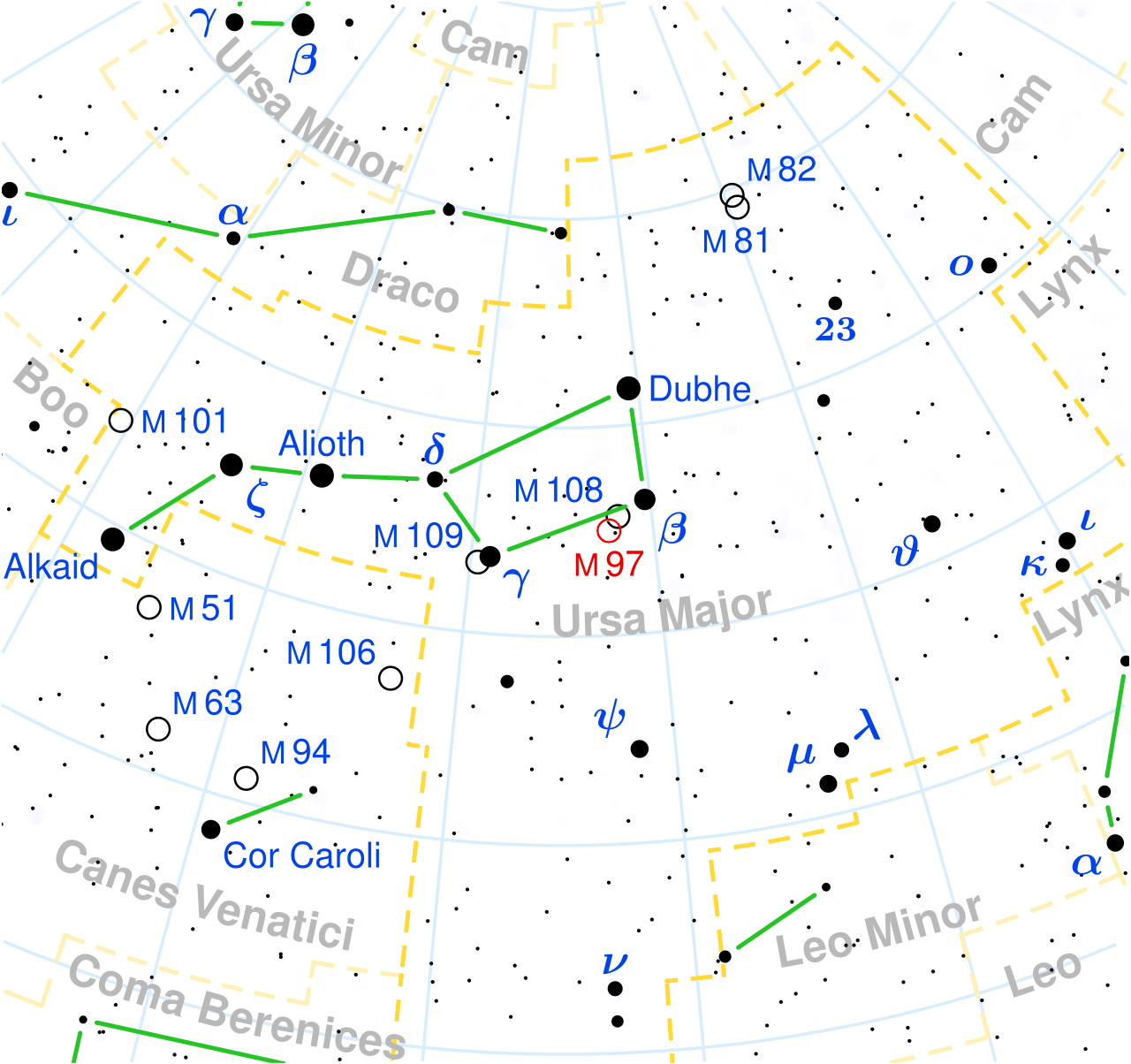
Location of M97 in Ursa Major

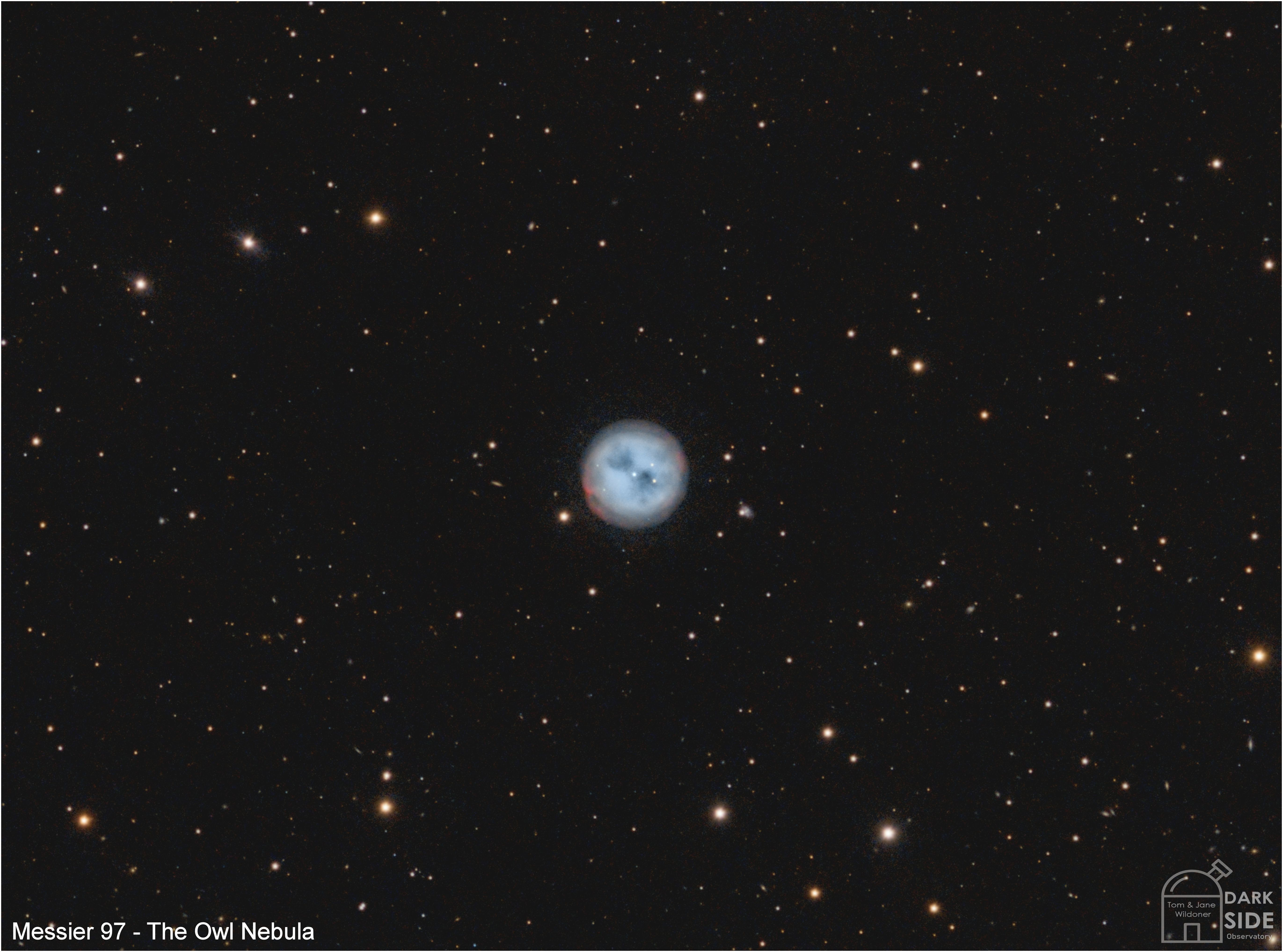
The Owl Nebula (also known as Messier 97, M97 or NGC 3587) - 239 x 60 second exposure.

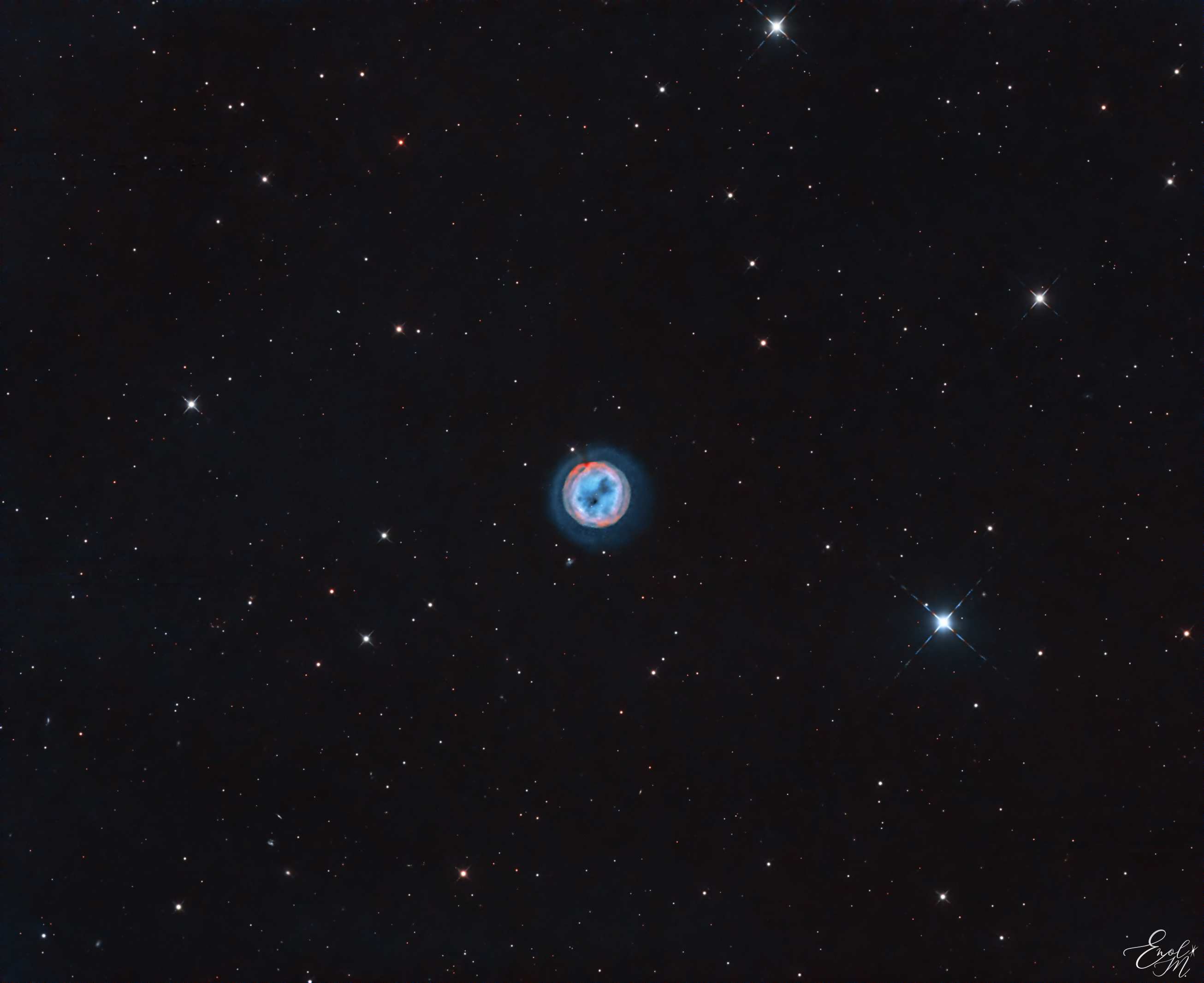
Outer O-III shell of M97 in a HOO composition

== See also ==
- Messier object
- List of Messier objects
- New General Catalogue
- List of planetary nebulae
