= ULAS J003402.77−005206.7 =

Brown dwarf star in the constellation Cetus

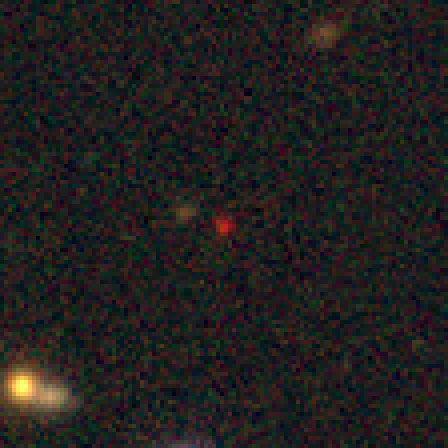
- ULAS J0034−00 (red object in the center); Credit: legacy surveys

Observation data Epoch J2000.0 Equinox J2000.0 (ICRS)
- Constellation: Cetus
- Right ascension: 00^{h} 34^{m} 02.771^{s}
- Declination: −00° 52′ 06.78″

Characteristics
- Spectral type: Y0

Astrometry
Parallax (π)	79.6±3.8 mas
Distance	41 ± 2 ly (12.6 ± 0.6 pc)

Details
Mass	0.005–0.019 M_{☉}
Surface gravity (log g)	4.0–4.5 cgs
Temperature	550–600 K
Age	0.1–2.0 Gyr

Database references
SIMBAD	data

Other designations
- ULAS J003402.77−005206.7; ULAS J0034−00

ULAS J003402.77−005206.7 (also ULAS J0034−00) is a T9-type brown dwarf in the constellation of Cetus.

ULAS J0034−00 is one of the coolest brown dwarfs known. It was first identified in data from the UK Infrared Telescope (UKIRT) Infrared Deep Sky Survey (UKIDSS). Infrared spectra subsequently taken with the IRS instrument on the Spitzer Space Telescope give an estimated effective temperature of between 550 and 600 K and does not emit any visible light. Its mass is estimated at between 5 and 20 Jupiter masses and its age at between 0.1 and 2.0 billion years.
