= ULAS J133553.45+113005.2 =

Star in constellation of Virgo

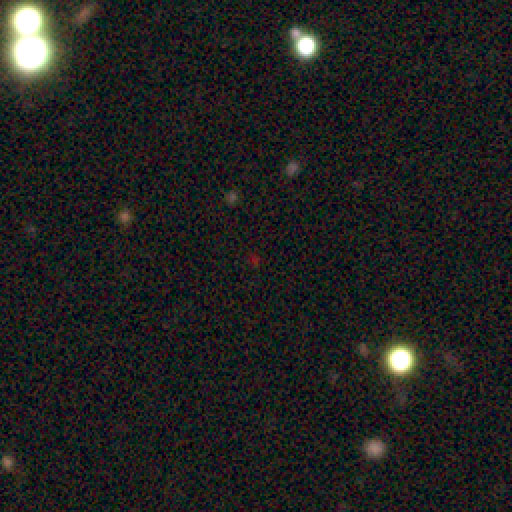
- ULAS1335; Credit: legacy surveys

Observation data Epoch J2000.0 Equinox J2000.0 (ICRS)
- Constellation: Virgo
- Right ascension: 13^{h} 35^{m} 53.45^{s}
- Declination: +11° 30′ 05.2″

Characteristics
- Spectral type: T9

Astrometry
Distance	26–40 ly (8–12 pc)

Details
Mass	0.014–0.030 M_{☉}
Temperature	500–550 K
Age	0.6–5.3 Gyr

Database references
SIMBAD	data

ULAS J133553.45+113005.2 (also called ULAS1335) is a T-type brown dwarf in the constellation of Virgo. It was discovered in data from the UK Infrared Telescope (UKIRT) Infrared Deep Sky Survey (UKIDSS) Large Area Survey (LAS). Its discovery was reported June 2008.

After identification, ULAS1335 was imaged using the UFTI camera on the UKIRT, on Mauna Kea, Hawaii, to confirm its photometric properties and location. It was spectroscopically confirmed as a T9 dwarf using the Gemini North telescope, also at Mauna Kea, and was imaged using IRAC on the Spitzer Space Telescope. The IRAC imaging confirmed it as the reddest (in near-to-mid-infrared colors) T dwarf yet discovered, and by inference the coolest.

ULAS1334 was initially estimated to have a temperature around 550–600 K, a distance of 8–12 parsecs (26–39 light-years), and a mass of 15–31 Jupiter masses. More recent spectroscopic observations, using IRS on the Spitzer Space Telescope, give an effective temperature of 500–550 K. Since these temperature estimates are based on model comparisons, they should be treated with caution until the parallax of this object has been measured.
