= 2MASS J11263991−5003550 =

Brown dwarf star in the constellation Centaurus 53 light years from Earth

Observation data Epoch J2000.0 Equinox J2000.0
- Constellation: Centaurus
- Right ascension: 11^{h} 26^{m} 39.80471^{s}
- Declination: −50° 03′ 54.8462″
- Apparent magnitude (V): 18.51

Characteristics
- Evolutionary stage: brown dwarf
- Spectral type: L4.5
- Variable type: Rotational

Astrometry
Radial velocity (R_{v})	49.3±1.1 km/s
Proper motion (μ)	RA: −1,589.907 mas/yr Dec.: +450.777 mas/yr
Parallax (π)	61.8331±0.2501 mas
Distance	52.7 ± 0.2 ly (16.17 ± 0.07 pc)

Details
Radius	0.8−1.2 R_{Jup}
Surface gravity (log g)	3.7+0.5 −0.1 cgs
Temperature	1270+60 −20 K
Rotation	3.2 ± 0.3 hours
Rotational velocity (v sin i)	22.8+1.6 −2.4 km/s

Other designations
- DENIS J112639.9-500355, WISEA J112638.07-500350.1, Gaia DR2 5372923621096443008

Database references
SIMBAD	data

2MASS J11263991−5003550 (2MASS J1126−5003) is a brown dwarf about 53 light-years distant from earth. The brown dwarf is notable for an unusual blue near-infrared color. This brown dwarf does not show subdwarf features and the blue color cannot be explained by an unresolved binary. Instead the blue color is explained by patchy clouds. The patchy cloud model allows thick clouds and a cloud coverage of 50% to explain the spectra of 2MASS J1126−5003. Other blue L-dwarfs exist, but are quite rare.

2MASS J1126−5003 has a deep water (H_{2}O) absorption feature in its spectra, which is comparable with late L-dwarfs and early T-dwarfs. It also shows weak carbon monoxide (CO) features. It lacks any methane (CH_{4}) feature and is therefore not a T-dwarf. Based on near-infrared spectra this brown dwarf was therefore classified as an L9 spectral type brown dwarf. The optical spectrum is on the other hand more similar to a mid-type L-dwarf. Here a spectral type of L4.5 fits the optical spectrum. This optical spectral type is a more reliable estimate as the near-infrared spectrum does not fit spectra from other L-dwarfs.

Lower metallicity and higher surface gravity might play a role in the formation of the weather on 2MASS J1126−5003. Lower metallicity reduces the available metal species to form cloud condensates. The higher surface gravity might cause an increased sedimentation of cloud condensates, resulting in thinner clouds. Other factors, like rotation, vertical upwelling and magnetic fields might play a role as well.

Previously one suggested scenario were thinner clouds. This brown dwarf shows variations in the J-band and at mid-infrared wavelengths with a period of 3.2±0.3 hours. This is a clear indication of patchy clouds.
