= ChaHα8 =

Binary brown dwarf in the constellation Chamaleon

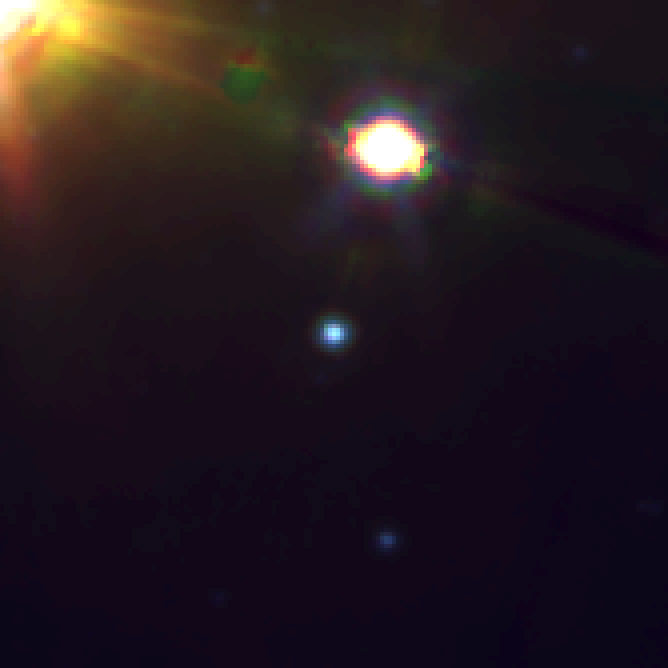
- ChaHα8 with the Spitzer Space Telescope

Observation data Epoch J2000 Equinox ICRS
- Constellation: Chamaeleon
- Right ascension: 11^{h} 07^{m} 46.091^{s}
- Declination: −77° 40′ 08.92″
- Apparent magnitude (V): 20.1

Characteristics
- Spectral type: M5.75–M6.5

Astrometry
Proper motion (μ)	RA: -23.455 mas/yr Dec.: 0.453 mas/yr
Parallax (π)	5.0899±0.0792 mas
Distance	641 ± 10 ly (196 ± 3 pc)

Orbit
Period (P)	1895±132 d
Semi-major axis (a)	1.02±0.06–1.17±0.07 AU
Eccentricity (e)	0.59±0.22
Periastron epoch (T)	2453163±214 JD
Argument of periastron (ω) (secondary)	106±26°
Semi-amplitude (K_{1}) (primary)	2.433±0.44 km/s

Details

ChaHα8 A
Mass	0.07–0.10 M_{☉}
Temperature	2910–3024 K
Rotational velocity (v sin i)	15.5±2.6 km/s
Age	~3 Myr

ChaHα8 B
Mass	25±7–31±8 M_{Jup}

Other designations
- 2MASS J11074610-7740089, CHSM 10837, SBC9 3352, Cha Hα 8

Database references
SIMBAD	data

ChaHα8 (also written ChaHa8 when Greek letters are unavailable) is a binary brown dwarf about 640 light-years (200 parsecs) from Earth in the constellation Chamaeleon. The designation indicates that it is in the Chamaeleon I star-forming region and that it displays hydrogen-alpha emission. It was discovered in 2000.

It was found in 2007 to have a low-mass substellar companion in orbit around it via radial velocity observations. The companion has a mass of 25–31 Jupiter masses, and the pair orbit each other with a period of 5.2 years and an eccentricity of 0.59.
