= CFBDS J005910.90−011401.3 =

Brown dwarf star in the constellation Cetus

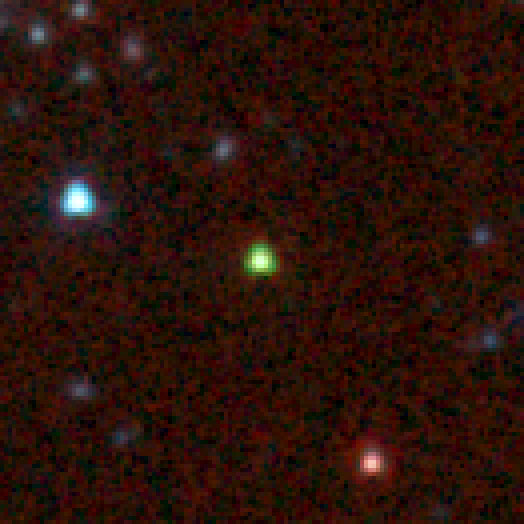
- infrared image of CFBDS J0059−0114; Credit: NASA/JPL Spitzer Space Telescope

Observation data Epoch J2000 Equinox ICRS
- Constellation: Cetus
- Right ascension: 00^{h} 59^{m} 10.83^{s}
- Declination: −01° 14′ 01.3″

Characteristics
- Spectral type: T8.5
- Apparent magnitude (J): 18.075
- Apparent magnitude (H): 18.27
- Apparent magnitude (K): 18.71

Astrometry
Parallax (π)	108.20±5.00 mas
Distance	30 ± 1 ly (9.2 ± 0.4 pc)

Details
Mass	15-30 M_{Jup}
Surface gravity (log g)	4.75 cgs
Temperature	620 K
Age	1-5 Myr

Other designations
- CFBDS J005910−011401, WISEP J005911.09−011400.6

Database references
SIMBAD	data

CFBDS J005910.90−011401.3 (also CFBDS J0059−0114 or CFBDS0059) is a brown dwarf with a low temperature of only 625 K, located in constellation Cetus about 30 light-years away.
