= HD 29587 =

Star in the constellation Perseus

Observation data Epoch J2000 Equinox ICRS
- Constellation: Perseus
- Right ascension: 04^{h} 41^{m} 36.31556^{s}
- Declination: +42° 07′ 06.4241″
- Apparent magnitude (V): 7.29

Characteristics
- Evolutionary stage: main sequence
- Spectral type: G2 V
- B−V color index: 0.633

Astrometry
Radial velocity (R_{v})	+112.75±0.16 km/s
Proper motion (μ)	RA: +534.631 mas/yr Dec.: −414.946 mas/yr
Parallax (π)	36.6470±0.0410 mas
Distance	89.00 ± 0.10 ly (27.29 ± 0.03 pc)
Absolute magnitude (M_{V})	5.08

Orbit
Period (P)	1,474.9±10.2 d
Eccentricity (e)	0.713±0.006
Periastron epoch (T)	JD 2,447,763.5±45.8
Argument of periastron (ω) (secondary)	80.2±13.3°
Semi-amplitude (K_{1}) (primary)	1.02±0.16 km/s

Details
Mass	1.033±0.010 M_{☉}
Radius	0.91 (Note: Derived from known temperature and luminousity of star; in good agreement with value derived from known mass and surface gravity of star) R_{☉}
Luminosity	0.798^{+0.040}_{−0.038} L_{☉}
Surface gravity (log g)	4.54±0.22 cgs
Temperature	5,709±35 K
Metallicity [Fe/H]	−0.51±0.05 dex
Age	14.7+3.8 −2.7 Gyr

Other designations
- BD+41°931, FK5 4419, HD 29587, HIP 21832, SAO 39690, TYC 2901-00064-1, 2MASS J04413631+4207065

Database references
SIMBAD	data
Exoplanet Archive	data

HD 29587 is a Sun-like star with a candidate brown dwarf companion in the northern constellation of Perseus. It has an apparent visual magnitude of 7.29, which means it is too faint to be viewed with the naked eye. Based upon an annual parallax shift of 36.6 mas, it is located 89.8 light years away. The star is moving away from the Earth with a heliocentric radial velocity of +113 km/s, having come to within 55.8 ly some 148,000 years ago. It is a hyper-velocity halo star moving at a rate of 170 km/s relative to the local standard of rest.

This ancient star has a stellar classification of G2 V, matching a G-type main-sequence star. It has 78% of the mass of the Sun and is radiating 80% of the Sun's luminosity from its photosphere at an effective temperature of 5,709 K.

== Planetary system ==
Formerly an IAU radial velocity standard, this star was found to have a variable radial velocity due to a suspected orbiting companion. The a sin i value for the unseen object is 0.0957 ± 0.0108 AU (14.31 ± 1.62 Gm), where a is the semimajor axis and i is the orbital inclination – providing a lower bound for the semimajor axis. The secondary object most likely has a mass in the range 41.0–97.8 M_{J}, making it a probable brown dwarf.

The HD 29587 planetary system
Companion (in order from star)	Mass	Semimajor axis (AU)	Orbital period (days)	Eccentricity	Inclination (°)	Radius
b	≥ 55.2±9.2 M_{J}	2.57 (Note: Derived from known mass of star and orbital period of object)	1,474.9±10.2	0.356±0.095	—	—

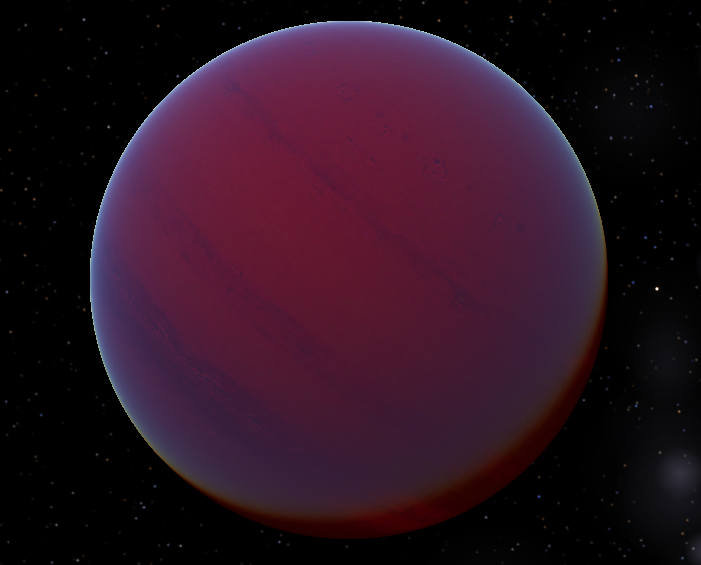
An artistic concept of the brown dwarf HD 29587 B
