= LP 944-20 =

Nearby brown dwarf in the constellation Fornax

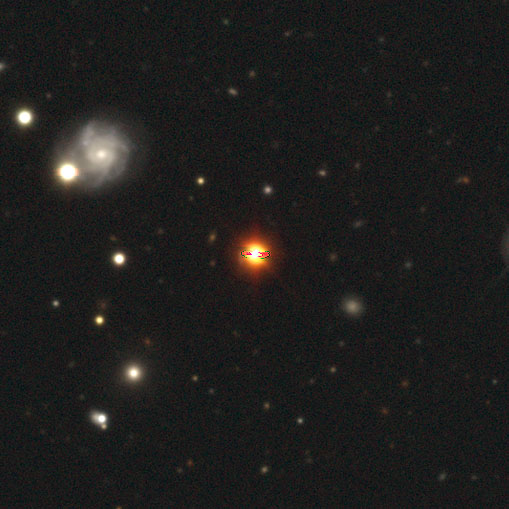
- LP 944-20; Credit: legacy surveys

Observation data Epoch J2000 Equinox J2000
- Constellation: Fornax
- Right ascension: 03^{h} 39^{m} 35.252^{s}
- Declination: –35° 25′ 43.64″
- Apparent magnitude (V): 18.69

Characteristics
- Spectral type: M9β
- Apparent magnitude (g): 19.7263±0.0083
- Apparent magnitude (r): 17.1191±0.0010
- Apparent magnitude (i): 16.8189±0.0014
- Apparent magnitude (z): 15.6215±0.0011
- Apparent magnitude (Y): 14.5973±0.0014
- Apparent magnitude (J): 10.725±0.021
- Apparent magnitude (H): 10.017±0.021
- Apparent magnitude (K): 9.548±0.023

Astrometry
Radial velocity (R_{v})	7.43±0.72 km/s
Proper motion (μ)	RA: 309.001(50) mas/yr Dec.: 269.058(64) mas/yr
Parallax (π)	155.5982±0.0522 mas
Distance	20.961 ± 0.007 ly (6.427 ± 0.002 pc)
Absolute magnitude (M_{V})	20.02

Details
Mass	29.62±16.67 M_{Jup}
Temperature	2,650 ± 30 K (2,376.8 ± 30.0 °C; 4,310.3 ± 54.0 °F) K
Rotation	3.8291±0.0084 h
Rotational velocity (v sin i)	28±4 km/s
Age	320 ±80 million years

Other designations
- LP 944-20, SIPS J0339−3525, LEHPM 3451, 2MASSI J0339352−352544, [B2006] J033935.2−352544, APMPM J0340−3526, 2MASS J03393521-3525440, 2MASSW J0339352−352544, BRI B0337−3535, BRI 0337−3535, 2MUCD 10201, Gaia DR2 4860376345833699840

Database references
SIMBAD	data
- Location of LP 944-20 in the constellation Fornax

LP 944-20 is a dim brown dwarf of spectral class M9 located 21 light-years from the Solar System in the constellation of Fornax. With a visual apparent magnitude of 18.69, it has one of the dimmest visual magnitudes listed on the RECONS page. In infrared wavelengths, it is one of the brightest brown dwarfs, if not the brightest at J_{MKO}=10.68±0.03 mag.

== Discovery ==
LP 944-20 was discovered in the Luyten-Palomar Survey. It appears as a star with R=17.5 mag with a proper motion of 334 mas/yr in a catalog from 1979. It was however first published in 1975 by Luyten & Kowal. It was re-discovered in the APM survey, a quasar survey, in which the red color was noticed. The first spectrum was published in 1997 by Kirkpatrick, Henry & Irwin. A spectral type of M9 or later was assigned in this work and a distance of around 5 parsec was established thanks to the parallax being measured. In 1998 Tinney discovered that this M-dwarf shows the 6708 Å Lithium absorption line and H-alpha emission line, which helped to constrain the age to around 500 million years and established it as a brown dwarf with a mass of around 60 M_{J}.

== Physical characteristics ==
Short after LP 944-20 was established as a brown dwarf, the fast rotation was detected in 1998. Later a work in 1999 claimed to have detected variability in LP 944-20. A search for dust around LP 944-20 has shown that it has no disk.

Due to short rotational period, this young brown dwarf is displaying strong and frequent X-ray flares, and possessing a strong magnetic field reaching 135 G at the photosphere level. On 15 December 1999, an X-ray flare was detected. On 27 July 2000, radio emission (in flare and quiescence) was detected from this brown dwarf by a team of students at the Very Large Array.

Observations published in 2007 showed that the atmosphere of LP 944-20 contains much lithium and that it has dusty clouds. A search for planets was carried out in 2006 using the radial velocity method. No planets were found, but variability with an amplitude of 3.5 km/s was detected. This variability is likely due to weather effects and the rotation of the brown dwarf.

In 2015 high resolution Doppler images were taken of LP 944-20 and GJ 791.2A. The time series spectra show line profile distortions, which were interpreted as starspots. These starspots were reconstructed and found to be concentrated at high latitudes. The modelling produces a better fit of ΔT=200 K (−73 °C; −100 °F) between starspots (T_{spot}=2,100 K (1,830 °C; 3,320 °F)) and photosphere (T_{phot}=2,300 K (2,030 °C; 3,680 °F)).

In a large program in 2016 the spectral type was established to be M9β in the optical and L0β in the infrared. The beta stands for a surface gravity intermediate between normal and low. The mass was calculated to be 29.62±16.67 M_{J}.

Observations with TESS found that LP 944-20 is variable with a period of around 3.8 hours and an amplitude of 1760±100 ppm. This is in agreement with previous estimates of a period of less than 4.5 hours.
