= List of star systems within 35–40 light-years =

This is a list of star systems within 35–40 light years of Earth.

== List ==
Key
#	Visible to the unaided eye
$	Bright star (absolute magnitude of +8.5 or brighter)
‡	White dwarf
§	Brown dwarf or sub-brown dwarf
*	Nearest in constellation

System	Star or (sub-) brown dwarf	Distance (ly)	Constellation	Coordinates: RA, Dec (Ep J2000, Eq J2000)	Stellar class	Apparent magnitude (V)	Parallax (mas)	Notes and additional references
Zeta Herculis	A$ (Tianji)	35.0 ± 0.2	Hercules	16^{h} 41^{m} 17.16104^{s} +31° 36′ 09.7873″	F9IV	2.81#		
Zeta Herculis	B	35.0 ± 0.2	Hercules	16^{h} 41^{m} 17.16104^{s} +31° 36′ 09.7873″	G7V			
AT Microscopii	A	35 ± 1	Microscopium	20^{h} 41^{m} 51.15925^{s} -32° 26′ 06.8283″	M4Ve		11.0/11.1	
AT Microscopii	B	35 ± 1	Microscopium	20^{h} 41^{m} 51.15925^{s} -32° 26′ 06.8283″	M4.5Ve		11.0/11.1	
2MASS 0243-2453§		35 ± 1	Fornax	02^{h} 43^{m} 13.72^{s} −24° 53′ 29.8″	T6			
2MASS 2228-4310§		35 ± 3 ^{+2.8}_{−2.4}	Grus	22^{h} 28^{m} 28.894^{s} −43° 10′ 26.27″	T6.5			
TVLM513-46546		35.1 ± 0.09	Boötes	15^{h} 01^{m} 08.18646^{s} +22° 50′ 02.1379″	M8.5V	15.09		It has one known exoplanet.
Gliese 617	B	35.109 ± 0.006		16^{h} 16^{m} 42.74635^{s} +67° 14′ 19.8316″	M3.0Ve			has 1 known planet
Gliese 617	A	35.117 ± 0.006		16^{h} 16^{m} 42.74635^{s} +67° 14′ 19.8316″	M1-Ve			has 1 known planet
Gliese 203		35.11 ± 0.92			M3.5Ve			
Gliese 3820		35.12 ± 0.32			M4.5V			
SCR J0838-5855	A	35.16 ± 0.22			M6.0			
SCR J0838-5855	B	35.16 ± 0.22			M			
HR 9038	A	35.2 ± 0.2	Cepheus	23^{h} 52^{m} 25.31799^{s} +75° 32′ 40.5141″	K3V	6.40/11.4		
HR 9038	B	35.2 ± 0.2	Cepheus	23^{h} 52^{m} 25.31799^{s} +75° 32′ 40.5141″	K3V			
HR 9038	C	35.2 ± 0.2	Cepheus	23^{h} 52^{m} 25.31799^{s} +75° 32′ 40.5141″	M2			
Gliese 488		35.2 ± 0.4			MV			
Delta Trianguli	A (Deltoton)	35.4 ± 0.3	Triangulum	02^{h} 17^{m} 03.23016^{s} +34° 13′ 27.2260″	G0V	4.865#		
Delta Trianguli	B	35.4 ± 0.3	Triangulum	02^{h} 17^{m} 03.23016^{s} +34° 13′ 27.2260″	K			
L 34-26		35.52 ± 0.06	Chamaeleon	07^{h} 49^{m} 12.678^{s} -76° 42′ 06.72″	M3	11.28		has one known planet.
GJ 4063		35.5292			M4V	11.75		
Beta Virginis (Zavijava)$		35.6 ± 0.3	Virgo	11^{h} 50^{m} 41.71824^{s} +01° 45′ 52.9910″	F9V	3.604#		
Gliese 86	A	35.6 ± 0.2	Eridanus	02^{h} 49^{m} 25.9191^{s} -50° 49′ 25.467″	K1V	6.17		has 1 known planet
Gliese 86	B	35.6 ± 0.2	Eridanus	02^{h} 49^{m} 25.9191^{s} -50° 49′ 25.467″	DQ6			has 1 known planet
SCR J1214-2345	A	35.69 ± 0.60			M4.5			
SCR J1214-2345	B	35.69 ± 0.60			T1			
G 239-25		35.77 ± 0.12			M3V			
HD 160346		35.88 ± 0.27	Ophiuchus		K3V			
2MASS J19513587-3510375		35.88 ± 6.52			M4			
WISE 2313-0837§		35.9			T8			
Gliese 438		35.94 ± 0.19			MV			
L 369-44	A	36.168			M5	12.67		
L 369-44	B	36.168			M			
2MASS J16452211-1319516		36.19 ± 0.33			L1.5			
Denebola (Beta Leonis)$		36.2 ± 0.4	Leo	11^{h} 49^{m} 03.57834^{s} +14° 34′ 19.4090″	A3V	2.113#		
HR 6806 (HD 166620)		36.2 ± 0.2	Hercules	18^{h} 09^{m} 37.41628^{s} +38° 27′ 27.9959″	K2V	6.40		
54 Piscium	A	36.2 ± 0.3	Pisces	00^{h} 39^{m} 21.80539^{s} +21° 15′ 01.7129″	K0V	5.88		has 1 known planet
54 Piscium	B	36.2 ± 0.3	Pisces	00^{h} 39^{m} 21.80539^{s} +21° 15′ 01.7129″	T7.5V			has 1 known planet
HIP 57050 (GJ 1148)		36.2 ± 1.1	Ursa Major	11^{h} 41^{m} 44.63584^{s} +42° 45′ 07.1021″	MV			has 2 known planets
Gamma Serpentis (Muning)$		36.3 ± 0.3	Serpens	15^{h} 56^{m} 27.18266^{s} +15° 39′ 41.8096″	F6V	3.85#		
HD 74576		36.3 ± 0.2			KV			
HD 85512		36.4 ± 0.3	Vela	09^{h} 51^{m} 07.05180^{s} -43° 30′ 10.0237″	K5V	7.66		has 1 known planet
Gliese 325	A	36.4 ^{+1.5}_{−1.4}			KV			
Gliese 325	B	36.4 ^{+1.5}_{−1.4}			M			
WD 0810–353 (UPM J0812-3529)		36.439 ± 0.006	Puppis	08^{h} 12^{m} 27.06600^{s} -35° 29′ 43.3241″	DAH	14.469		
11 Leonis Minoris	A	36.5 ± 0.3	Leo Minor	09^{h} 35^{m} 39.50219^{s} +35° 48′ 36.4770″	G8V	4.80/12.50		
11 Leonis Minoris	B	36.5 ± 0.3	Leo Minor	09^{h} 35^{m} 39.50219^{s} +35° 48′ 36.4770″	M5V			
WISE 0325+0831		36.5			T7			
Theta Persei$	A	36.6 ± 0.3	Perseus	02^{h} 44^{m} 11.98704^{s} +49° 13′ 42.4111″	F7V	4.12/10#		
Theta Persei$	B	36.6 ± 0.3	Perseus	02^{h} 44^{m} 11.98704^{s} +49° 13′ 42.4111″	M1V			
HD 115404	A	36.6 ± 0.4	Coma Berenices	13^{h} 16^{m} 51.051430^{s} +17° 01′ 01.840901″	K2V	6.61		
HD 115404	B	36.6 ± 0.4	Coma Berenices	13^{h} 16^{m} 51.051430^{s} +17° 01′ 01.840901″	M1V			
Arcturus (Alpha Boötes)$		36.7 ± 0.3	Boötes	14^{h} 15^{m} 39.7^{s} +19° 10′ 56″	K0III	-0.05#		
ADS 48	A	36.7 ± 0.6	Andromeda	00^{h} 05^{m} 41.0219^{s} +45° 48′ 43.545″	K6V	8.83/9.00/9.97		
ADS 48	B	36.7 ± 0.6	Andromeda	00^{h} 05^{m} 41.0219^{s} +45° 48′ 43.545″	M0.5V			
G 107-69/70	A	36.76 ± 0.01	Lynx	07^{h} 30^{m} 42.7784^{s} +48° 11′ 58.5889″	M4.5	13.2		
G 107-69/70	B	36.76 ± 0.01	Lynx	07^{h} 30^{m} 42.7784^{s} +48° 11′ 58.5889″	DA			
G 107-69/70	C	36.76 ± 0.01	Lynx	07^{h} 30^{m} 42.7784^{s} +48° 11′ 58.5889″	DA			
WISE 0038+2768		36.9			T9			
Eta Boötis (Muphrid)$		37.0 ± 0.3	Boötes	13^{h} 54^{m} 41.07892^{s} +18° 23′ 51.7946″	G0IV	2.680#		
Gliese 208		37.1 ± 0.6	Orion	05^{h} 36^{m} 30.991^{s} +11° 19′ 40.33″	M0.0 Ve	8.9		
Gliese 902		37.2 ± 0.3	Indus	23^{h} 39^{m} 37.38737^{s} -72° 43′ 19.7554″	KV			
WISE 0627-1114§		37.2			T6			
WISE 1959-3338§		37.2			T8			
Gliese 169		37.4 ± 0.5			KV			
WISE 0623-0456§		37.5		06^{h} 23^{m} 09.68^{s} -04° 56′ 23.52″	T8			
WISE 2325-4105§		37.5			T9pec			
ADS 48 F		37.51 ± 0.02	Andromeda	00^{h} 05^{m} 41.0219^{s} +45° 48′ 43.545″	M1V			
HR 5553 (DE Boötis)		37.6 ± 0.4	Boötes	14^{h} 53^{m} 23.76674^{s} +19° 09′ 10.0813″	K0V	6.00		
WISE 2340-0745§		37.8			T7			
Gliese 3417		37.88 ± 0.96			M4.5V			
L 499-1		38	Columba*		M4V			
Zeta Doradus$	A	38.0 ± 0.2	Dorado	05^{h} 05^{m} 30.65618^{s} -57° 28′ 21.7289″	F7V	4.82/9.02#		
Zeta Doradus$	B	38.0 ± 0.2	Dorado	05^{h} 05^{m} 30.65618^{s} -57° 28′ 21.7289″	K7V			
SCR J0640-0552		38.04 ± 1.27			M2			
SSSPM J0829-1309		38.128 ± 0.077			L2			
Iota Pegasi$	A (Jiu)	38.3 ± 0.3	Pegasus	22^{h} 07^{m} 00.66206^{s} +25° 20′ 42.3761″	F5V	3.84/6.68#		
Iota Pegasi$	B	38.3 ± 0.3	Pegasus	22^{h} 07^{m} 00.66206^{s} +25° 20′ 42.3761″	G8V			
Lambda Serpentis$		38.3 ± 0.4	Serpens	15^{h} 46^{m} 26.61423^{s} +07° 21′ 11.0475″	G0V	4.43#		has 1 known planet
Gliese 773.6		38.5 ± 5.8			KV			
WISE J1206+8401		38.5 ± 1.0	Camelopardalis	12^{h} 06^{m} 08.19^{s} +84° 01′ 13.10″	Y0			
Delta Capricorni (Deneb Algedi)$		38.6 ± 0.4	Capricornus	21^{h} 47^{m} 02.44424^{s} -16° 07′ 38.2335″	A7mIII	2.81#		
HD 125072		38.6 ± 0.4	Centaurus	14^{h} 19^{m} 04.83414^{s} -59° 22′ 44.5272″	K3IV	6.637		
L 43-72		38.66 ± 0.71			M4.5			
Gamma Virginis (Porrima)$	A	38.7 ± 0.4	Virgo	12^{h} 41^{m} 39.64344^{s} -01° 26′ 57.7421″	F0V	2.74		
Gamma Virginis (Porrima)$	B	38.7 ± 0.4	Virgo	12^{h} 41^{m} 39.64344^{s} -01° 26′ 57.7421″	F0V			
L 449-1		38.7 ± 0.6			MV			
WISE 0759-4904§		38.8			T8			
Gliese 414 B (GJ 414)		38.70	Ursa Major	11^{h} 11^{m} 02.54^{s} +30° 26′ 41.3″	M2V	9.98		
Gliese 414 A (GJ 414)		38.76	Ursa Major	11^{h} 11^{m} 05.17^{s} +30° 26′ 45.7″	K7V	8.864		Has two known exoplanets (b and c)
WISE 0751-7634§		39.1			T9			
G 180-060		39.20 ± 1.19			M6V			
Gliese 806		39.348 ± 0.008	Cygnus	20^{h} 45^{m} 04.09925^{s} +44° 29′ 56.6451″	dM1.5	+10.79		Has 3 exoplanets.
Zeta Reticuli	A	39.4 ± 0.3	Reticulum	03^{h} 17^{m} 46.16345^{s} -62° 34′ 31.1525″	G3V	5.22		
Zeta Reticuli	B	39.4 ± 0.3	Reticulum	03^{h} 17^{m} 46.16345^{s} -62° 34′ 31.1525″	G2V			
Zeta Trianguli Australis$		39.5 ± 0.3	Triangulum Australe	16^{h} 28^{m} 28.14362^{s} -70° 05′ 03.8419″	F9V	4.90#		
85 Pegasi	A	39.5 ± 0.4	Pegasus	00^{h} 02^{m} 10.16^{s} +27° 04′ 56.1″	G5Vb	5.75/8.89		
85 Pegasi	B	39.5 ± 0.4	Pegasus	00^{h} 02^{m} 10.16^{s} +27° 04′ 56.1″	K7V			
Gliese 798		39.5 ± 0.6			KV			
Gliese 180 (GJ 180)		39.5 ^{+1.2}_{−1.1}	Eridanus	04^{h} 53^{m} 24.3093^{s} -17° 46′ 24.3093″	MV	10.894		has 2 known planets
TRAPPIST-1		39.5 ± 1.3	Aquarius	23^{h} 06^{m} 29.368^{s} -05° 02′ 29.04″	M8.2V	18.80		has 7 known planets and a candidate (i)
WISE 1653+4444		39.5			T8			
Gliese 3304		39.53 ± 1.43			M4.5V			
HR 3384 (11 G. Pyxidis)		39.7 ± 0.3	Pyxis	08^{h} 32^{m} 51.49609^{s} -30° 31′ 03.0717″	G9V	6.38		
V538 Aurigae		39.9 ± 0.4	Auriga	05^{h} 41^{m} 20.33573^{s} +53° 28′ 51.8106″	K1V	6.25		
System	Star or (sub-) brown dwarf	Distance (ly)	Constellation	Coordinates: RA, Dec (Ep J2000, Eq J2000)	Stellar class	Apparent magnitude (V)	Parallax (mas)	Notes and additional references

== See also ==
- Lists of stars
- List of star systems within 30–35 light-years
- List of star systems within 40–45 light-years
- List of nearest stars and brown dwarfs
