= Gliese 414 =

Binary star system in the constellation Ursa Major

Observation data Epoch J2000 Equinox J2000
Constellation	Ursa Major (Note: Constellation obtained with a right ascension of 11^{h} 11^{m} 5.17^{s} and a declination of +30° 26′ 45.7″ on this website.)
- GJ 414 A
Right ascension	11^{h} 11^{m} 05.17^{s}
Declination	+30° 26′ 45.7″
- Apparent magnitude (V): 8.864±0.012
- GJ 414 B
Right ascension	11^{h} 11^{m} 02.54^{s}
Declination	+30° 26′ 41.3″
- Apparent magnitude (V): 10

Characteristics

GJ 414 A
- Spectral type: K7V
- B−V color index: 1.255

GJ 414 B
- Spectral type: M2V
- B−V color index: 2.41±0.34

Astrometry

GJ 414 A
Radial velocity (R_{v})	−16.63 km/s
Proper motion (μ)	RA: 591.622±0.0812 mas/yr Dec.: −197.247±0.0911 mas/yr
Parallax (π)	84.1766±0.0258 mas
Distance	38.75 ± 0.01 ly (11.880 ± 0.004 pc)

GJ 414 B
Radial velocity (R_{v})	−15.34 km/s
Proper motion (μ)	RA: 604.831±0.0806 mas/yr Dec.: −206.442±0.0751 mas/yr
Parallax (π)	84.1554±0.0200 mas
Distance	38.756 ± 0.009 ly (11.883 ± 0.003 pc)

Details

GJ 414 A
Mass	0.65±0.08 M_{☉}
Radius	0.68±0.14 R_{☉}
Luminosity	0.119±0.013 L_{☉}
Habitable zone inner limit	0.37 AU
Habitable zone outer limit	0.70 AU
Temperature	4120±109 K
Metallicity [Fe/H]	0.24±0.1 dex
Rotational velocity (v sin i)	3 km/s
Age	12.4±5.2 Gyr

GJ 414 B
Mass	0.542±0.022 M_{☉}
Radius	0.548±0.017 R_{☉}
Luminosity	0.05 L_{☉}
Temperature	3663±70 K
Metallicity [Fe/H]	0.08±0.09 dex
Age	11.2±5.9 Gyr

Other designations
- Gliese 414, HD 97101, LHS 2367, DO 14370, HIC 54646, HIP 54646, LFT 767, LTT 13009, NLTT 26534, 2MASS J11110509+3026459, TIC 9001920, TYC 2520-2524-1, WDS J11111+3027A, WISEA J111105.67+302643.6, Gaia EDR3 732857558276385664

Position (relative to Gliese 414 A)
Component	Gliese 414 B
Angular distance	34.34″
Projected separation	408 AU

Database references
SIMBAD	data

Gliese 414, also known as GJ 414, is a binary system made up of an orange dwarf and a red dwarf, located about 39 light years from Earth, in the constellation Ursa Major. With an apparent magnitude of 8.31, it is not visible to the naked eye. The primary component of the system has two known exoplanets.

== Characteristics ==
The main component of the system, Gliese 414 A, is a relatively active orange dwarf, about 68% the size of the Sun and 65% its mass. Its age is estimated at 12.4 billion years, about two and a half times the age of the Solar System. It is orbited by two known exoplanets, called Gliese 414 Ab and Gliese 414 Ac.

The secondary component, Gliese 414 B, is a red dwarf of type M2V, that is 55% the size of the Sun and 54% its mass. Unlike its companion star, Gliese 414 B is not orbited by any known planets.

The binary star system is located in the northern hemisphere, approximately 38.8 light years from Earth, in the direction of the constellation Ursa Major. The closest star to the star system is CW Ursae Majoris, at a distance of 5.3 light-years.

Nearest stars to Gliese 414
Name	Distance (light-years)
CW Ursae Majoris	5.3
DS Leonis	5.9
2MASS J10475+2124	7.8
Gliese 1138	8.1
Gliese 1134	8.3

== Planetary system ==
The primary star, Gliese 414 A, is orbited by two exoplanets. They were discovered in 2020 by analyzing radial velocity data from Keck's HIRES instrument and the Automated Planet Finder at Lick Observatory, as well as photometric data from KELT.

The innermost planet, Gliese 414 Ab, orbits its star at an average distance of 0.23 astronomical units, making it close to the optimistic habitable zone. Its orbit is eccentric (e = 0.45), which causes the distance from its star to vary from 0.13 to 0.34 AU, and its equilibrium temperature is calculated at 36 °C. With a minimum mass of 7.6 M_{🜨}, it is likely to have a significant volatile-rich envelope, thus being a poor candidate for habitability.

The outermost planet, Gliese 414 Ac, is a super-Neptune that orbits its star at a greater distance of 1.4 astronomical units, which makes it a frigid planet, having an equilibrium temperature of about -150 °C. It is a good candidate for future direct imaging missions.

The Gliese 414 A planetary system
Companion (in order from star)	Mass	Semimajor axis (AU)	Orbital period (days)	Eccentricity	Inclination	Radius
b	≥7.6+2.44 −2.19 M_{🜨}	0.232±0.01	50.8+0.01 −0.26	0.45+0.19 −0.22	—	2.63+1.22 −0.85 R_{🜨}
c	≥53.83+9.18 −8.58 M_{🜨}	1.4+0.055 −0.06	749.83+4.35 −3.63	0.105+0.110 −0.703	—	8.4+3.6 −2.5 R_{🜨}

== See also ==
- List of star systems within 35–40 light-years
