= Gliese 414 Ac =

Frigid super-Neptune exoplanet orbiting GJ 414 A

Gliese 414 A c
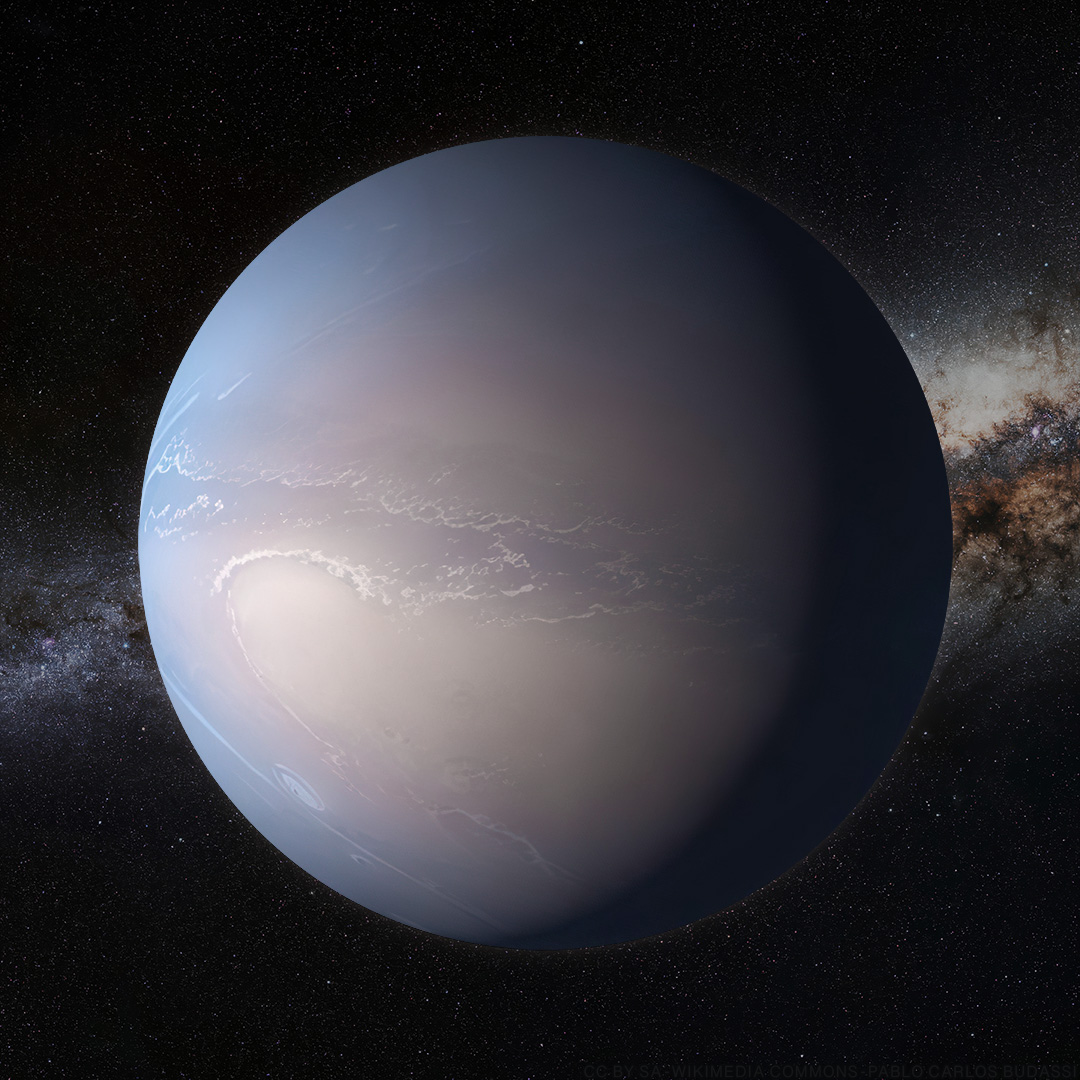
- Artistical representation of a super-Neptune exoplanet

Discovery
- Discovered by: Dedrick et al.
- Discovery date: 2020
- Detection method: Radial velocity

Designations
- Alternative names: HD 97101 Ac, HIP 54646 c

Orbital characteristics
- Semi-major axis: 1.4+0.055 −0.06 AU
- Eccentricity: 0.093+0.1 −0.064
- Orbital period (sidereal): 749.83+4.35 −3.63 d 2.054 year
- Argument of perihelion: 74°+74° −200°
- Star: Gliese 414 A

Physical characteristics
- Mean radius: 8.4+3.6 −2.5 R_{🜨} (0.749+0.321 −0.223 R_{J})
- Mass: 53.83+9.18 −8.58 M_{🜨} (0.169+0.029 −0.027 M_{J})
- Temperature: 123.3±13.2 K (−149.7 °C [−237.5 °F]) (Note: Assuming a bond albedo of 0.343, the same as Saturn.)

Gliese 414 Ac, or GJ 414 Ac, is an exoplanet orbiting Gliese 414 A, a K-type main-sequence star located 39 light-years from Earth, in the constellation Ursa Major. (Note: Obtained with a right ascension of 11^{h} 11^{m} 5.17^{s} and a declination of +30° 26′ 45.7″ on this website.) It is classified as a super-Neptune exoplanet, being at least 54 times more massive than the Earth and about 8.5 times larger. Gliese 414 Ac orbits its parent star at a distance of 1.4 astronomical units and completes one revolution around it every two years and 20 days. It is one of the two planets orbiting Gliese 414 A, the other is Gliese 414 Ab, a sub-Neptune.

== Characteristics ==
Gliese 414 Ac is classified as a super-Neptune (or sub-Saturn), a type of exoplanets that are more massive than Neptune, but less massive than Saturn, having masses between 20 and 80 M_{🜨}. The planet has a minimum mass of 54 M_{🜨} and a radius of 8.4 R_{🜨}, both values between Neptune and Saturn. (Note: Neptune has a mass of 17.15 M_{🜨} and a radius of 3.88 R_{🜨}, while Saturn has a mass of 95.2 M_{🜨} and a radius of 9.45 R_{🜨}.)

It completes one orbit around its star approximately every two years, and is located at a distance of 1.4 AU (210 million km) from it, too far to be located in the habitable zone of its star, which extends up to 0.7 AU. Due to the great separation from its star, the planet is frigid, having an equilibrium temperature of around −150 °C, comparable to Saturn, which has a temperature of −140 °C. Gliese 414 Ac is as a potential candidate for future direct imaging missions.

== Discovery ==
Gliese 414 Ac was discovered in 2020 by analyzing radial velocity data from Keck's HIRES instrument and the Automated Planet Finder at Lick Observatory, as well as photometric data from KELT.

== Host star ==
Gliese 414 Ac orbits Gliese 414 A, an orange dwarf (spectral type K7V) that is smaller and cooler than the Sun. The star has a radius of 0.68 R_{☉}, a mass of 0.65 M_{☉} and a temperature of 4,120 K (3,850 °C). It is a binary star, having an orbital companion called Gliese 414 B, a red dwarf star that is at a projected distance of 408 astronomical units from it.

The stellar system is located about 39 light-years from the Earth, in the constellation Ursa Major. Both stars are too faint and cannot be seen with the naked eye.

There is another planet orbiting Gliese 414 A. Named Gliese 414 Ab, it is a sub-Neptune that is located 0.23 AU (34 million km) from it (six times closer than Gliese 414 Ac). The planet has an eccentric orbit and its distance from its star varies between 0.13 and 0.34 AU, which means that it is occasionally located in the optimistic habitable zone. The planet has a radius of 2.95 R_{🜨} and a minimum mass of 7.6 M_{🜨}.

== See also ==
- List of coldest exoplanets
- Super-Neptune
- Ursa Major
- Gliese 414
- List of star systems within 35–40 light-years
