= 2MASS J10475385+2124234 =

Brown dwarf star in the constellation Leo

Observation data Epoch J2000 Equinox J2000
- Constellation: Leo
- Right ascension: 10^{h} 47^{m} 53.85456^{s}
- Declination: 21° 24′ 23.4684″

Characteristics
- Spectral type: T6.5
- Apparent magnitude (J): 15.819 ± 0.059
- Apparent magnitude (H): 15.797 ± 0.120
- Apparent magnitude (K): 16.20 ± 0.03

Astrometry
| Proper motion (μ) | RA: −1714 mas/yr Dec.: −489 mas/yr |
| Parallax (π) | 94.73±3.81 mas |
| Distance | 34 ± 1 ly (10.6 ± 0.4 pc) |

Details
| Mass | 42±26 M_{Jup} |
| Radius | 0.94 ± 0.16 R_{Jup} |
| Luminosity | 4.35×10^{−6} L_{☉} |
| Surface gravity (log g) | 4.96 ± 0.49 cgs |
| Temperature | 880 ± 76 K |
| Rotation | 1.77 ± 0.04 h |

Other designations
- 2MASSW J1047539+212423; 2MASSI J1047539+212423; 2MASSI J1047538+212423; WISEA J104752.35+212417.2

Database references
| SIMBAD | data |

2MASS J10475385+2124234 (abbreviated to 2MASS J1047+21) is a brown dwarf of spectral class T6.5, in the constellation Leo. This object lies at a distance of 34 light-years from Earth. It first attracted attention by becoming the first brown dwarf of spectral class T from which radio waves were detected. This discovery then permitted its wind speeds to be computed.

== Discovery ==
2MASS J1047+21 was discovered in 1999 along with eight other brown dwarf candidates during the Two Micron All-Sky Survey (2MASS), conducted from 1997 to 2001. Follow-up observations with the Keck I 10-meter telescope's Near Infrared Camera (NIRC) were conducted on 27 May 1999 and identified methane in 2MASS J1047+21's near-infrared spectrum, classifying it as a T-type brown dwarf.

== Detection of radio emissions ==
In 2010, astronomers using the Arecibo Radio Telescope discovered bursts of low-frequency radio waves coming from 2MASS J1047+21. This radio emission comes from electrons spiraling around the magnetic field lines of the brown dwarf. Since the frequency of the radio emission is linked to the strength of the magnetic field, the team measured a magnetic field strength of 1.7 kG. The bursts were also found to drift in frequency, in a manner reminiscent of certain types of solar radio emission. The radio emissions, together with the detection of Hα, which is usually found in stellar chromospheres, shows that 2MASS J1047+21 is magnetically active.

=== Measurement of wind speed ===
The wind speed is directly inferred from minute, regular cycles in its visible (which matches its ultra-violet) appearance compared to the same at radio wave spectra. The radio emissions are coming from electrons interacting with the magnetic field, which is rooted deep in the interior. The visible and infrared (IR) data, on the other hand, reveal what's happening in the gas giant's cloud tops.

== Characteristics ==
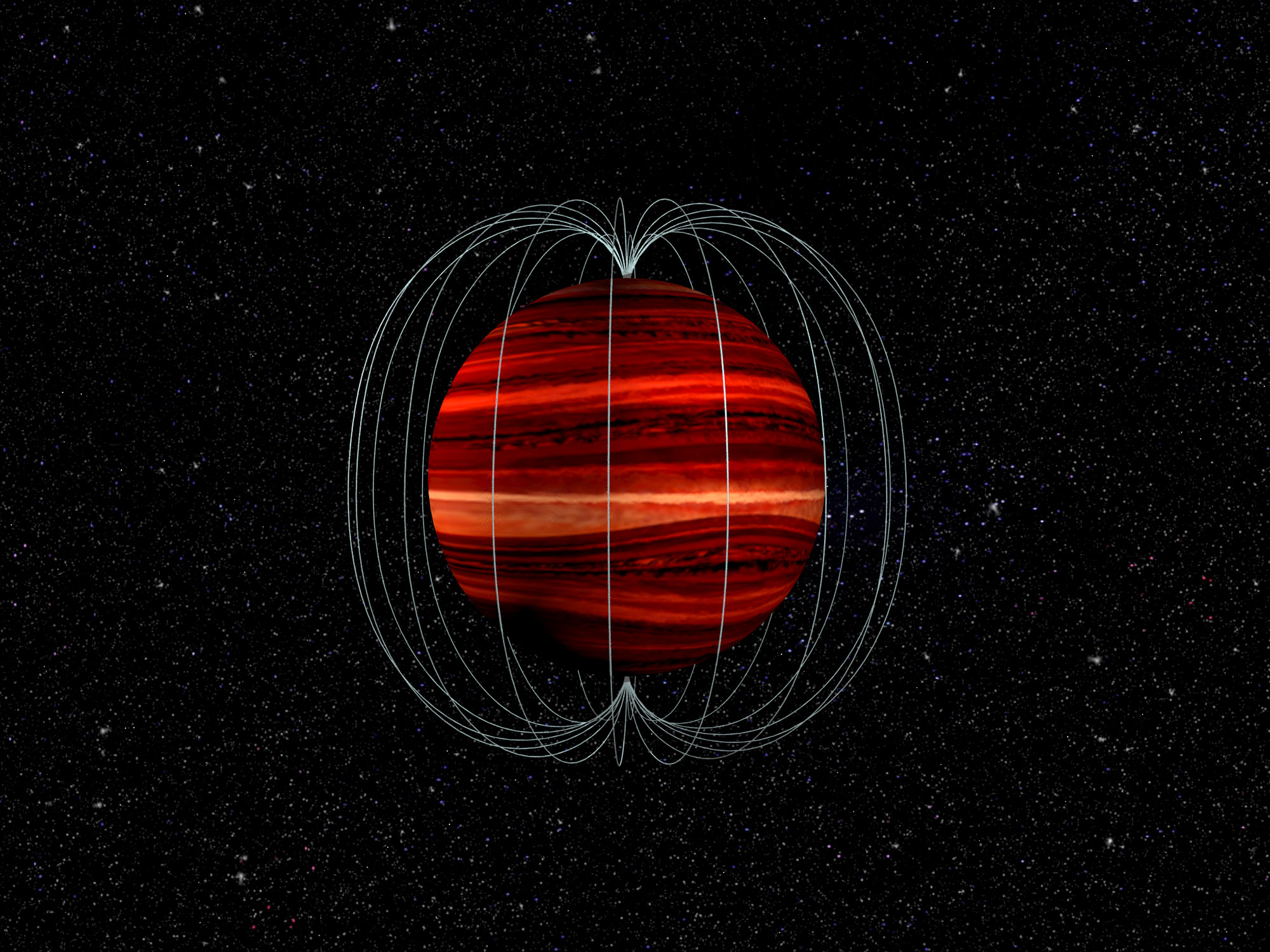
Artist's impression of a brown dwarf and its magnetic field

Radio emissions imply a magnetic field strength greater than 1.7 kG, or approximately 3000 times stronger than the Earth's magnetic field.

=== Wind speeds ===
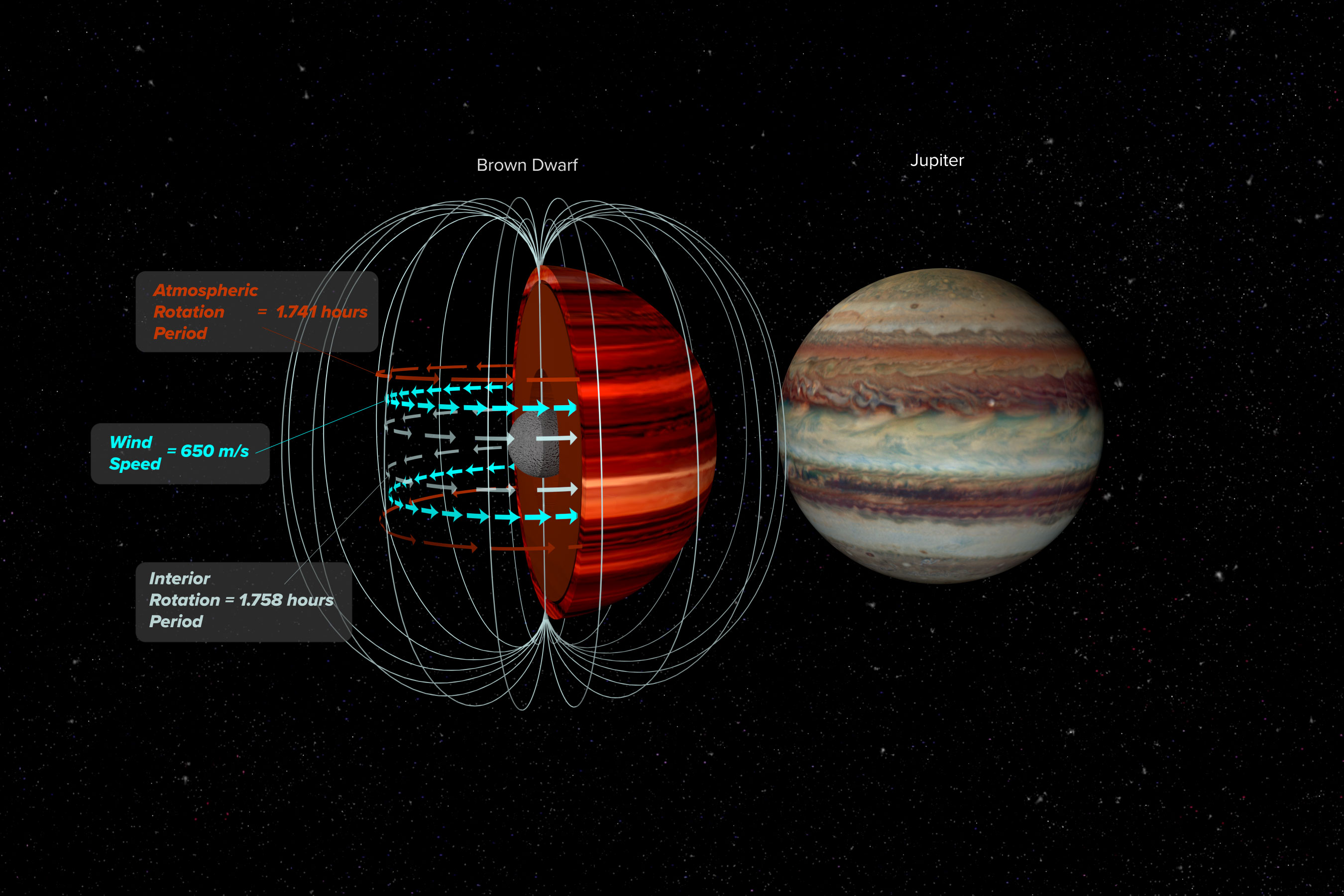
Artist's concept of the interior structure of a brown dwarf. The magnetic field rotates at a different rate than the top of the atmosphere.

Wind speeds on 2MASS J1047+21 were measured to be 650 ± 310 metres per second (1,450 ± 690 mph) by the Spitzer Space Telescope.

== See also ==
- List of stars in Leo

other T-dwarfs with radio emission:

- SIMP J013656.5+093347.3 T2.5, planetary-mass object
- WISEPC J112254.73+255021.5 T6
- WISEPA J101905.63+652954.2 T5.5+T7.0
- WISEPA J062309.94-045624.6 T8
- 2MASS 1237+6526 T6.5
- 2MASS 2228-4310 T6
