= WISEPA J101905.63+652954.2 =

WISE 1019+6529 is a pair of brown dwarfs

WISE 1019+6529
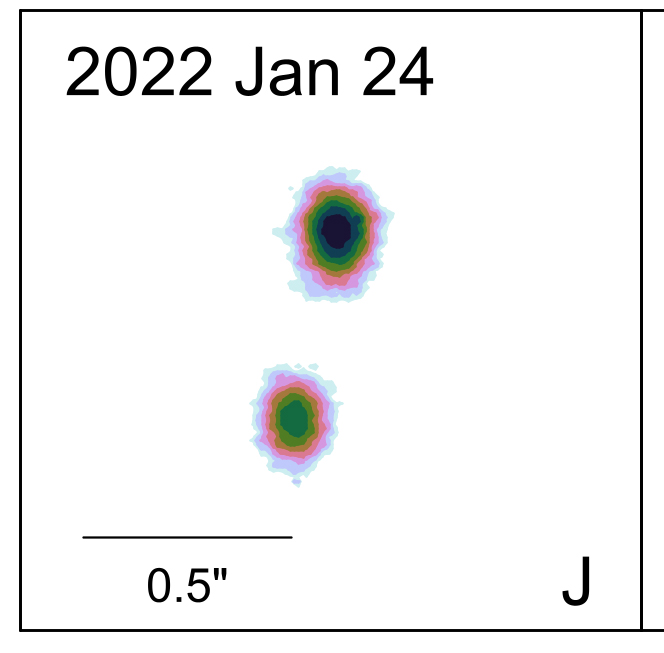
- The binary WISE 1019+6529 with Keck AO

Observation data Epoch J2000 Equinox J2000
- Constellation: Ursa Major
- Right ascension: 10^{h} 19^{m} 05.75^{s}
- Declination: +65° 29′ 52.70″

Characteristics
- Evolutionary stage: binary brown dwarf
- Spectral type: T5.5 ± 0.5 & T7.0 ± 0.5

Astrometry
Parallax (π)	41.25±1.75 mas
Distance	79 ± 3 ly (24 ± 1 pc)

Orbit
Primary	WISE 1019+6529A
Name	WISE 1019+6529B
Period (P)	>30 yr
Semi-major axis (a)	>5.2 AU
Eccentricity (e)	<0.96
Inclination (i)	<86°

Details

WISE 1019+6529A
Mass	41 ± 18 M_{Jup}
Luminosity (bolometric)	10^{−4.994 ± 0.063} L_{☉}
Surface gravity (log g)	5.5 cgs
Temperature	1000 K
Rotation	3.13+0.32 −0.27 hours

WISE 1019+6529B
Mass	32 ± 16 M_{Jup}
Rotation	0.7866 hours

Position (relative to WISE 1019+6529A)
Component	WISE 1019+6529B
Epoch of observation	15 January 2015
Angular distance	423.0 ± 1.6 mas
Position angle	161.71 ± 0.23°
Projected separation	9.9 ± 0.4 AU

Other designations
- 2MASS J10190575+6529526, CNS5 2530, TIC 287254768, WISEA J101905.61+652954.0, WISEP J101905.63+652954.2, WISE J101905.62+652954.2, EQ J1019+6529

Database references
SIMBAD	data

WISEPA J101905.63+652954.2 (also called WISE 1019+6529) is a binary made up of two cold brown dwarfs. Both brown dwarfs have a late spectral type T. The pair was detected in radio emission, which is pulsed and periodic. The radio emission could, in principle, be powered by the interaction of the binary.

WISE 1019+6529 was discovered in 2011 with the Wide-field Infrared Survey Explorer and spectroscopy from the NASA Infrared Telescope Facility, Palomar and Keck Observatory confirmed it as a T6 or T7-dwarf. A preliminary parallax is published, placing it 24 parsec distant from the Solar System, and it has a proper motion of 150.6 ±1.1 mas/yr. In 2023 a study was published, describing the 144 MHz highly circularly polarised radio emission detected with the Low Frequency Array (LOFAR). The same paper describes observations with Keck adaptive optics, which showed that the brown dwarf is a binary. The researchers find a polar dipole magnetic field strength of 660 ± 300 Gauss for the T5.5 dwarf and 460 ± 210 Gauss for the T7.0 dwarf. The surface magnetic field strength is constrained between 51.4 and 10^{3} Gauss, which was constrained with cyclotron maser emission and the upper limit of H-alpha luminosity. The radio emission could, in principle, be powered by a binary interaction, if the mass loss rate is ≥25 tonnes per second. The researchers also find that the radio emission is consistent with a Jupiter-like aurora. Follow-up observations did result in 52 hours of LOFAR observations over a period of six years. No additional radio pulse was detected, but the researchers find that the circularly polarised emission is persistent. Besides the previous period of around 3 hours, the researchers find an additional period of 0.79 hours. The researchers suggest this could be the rotation period of the secondary, but follow-up observations with infrared telescopes are needed to confirm this. If confirmed this rotation period would be the shortest for any brown dwarf (as of October 2025). Additionally it was shown that the components of binary stars usually have similar rotation periods, but the components of WISE 1019+6529 would have very different rotation periods. Observations with three radio telescopes (LOFAR, GMRT, VLA) did only detect the binary at MHz with LOFAR and is missing at higher frequencies. The researchers interpret this as the cutoff created by electron cyclotron maser emission. This radio spectral cutoff allowed for a measurement of the polar surface field strength, which was measured at 126 Gauss.

== See also ==
Other T-dwarfs with detected radio emission

- SIMP J013656.5+093347.3 T2.5, planetary-mass object
- 2MASS J10475385+2124234 T6.5
- WISEPC J112254.73+255021.5 T6
- WISEPA J062309.94-045624.6 T8
- 2MASS 1237+6526 T6.5
- 2MASS 2228-4310 T6
