= WISEPC J112254.73+255021.5 =

Brown dwarf star in the constellation Leo

WISE J1122+25
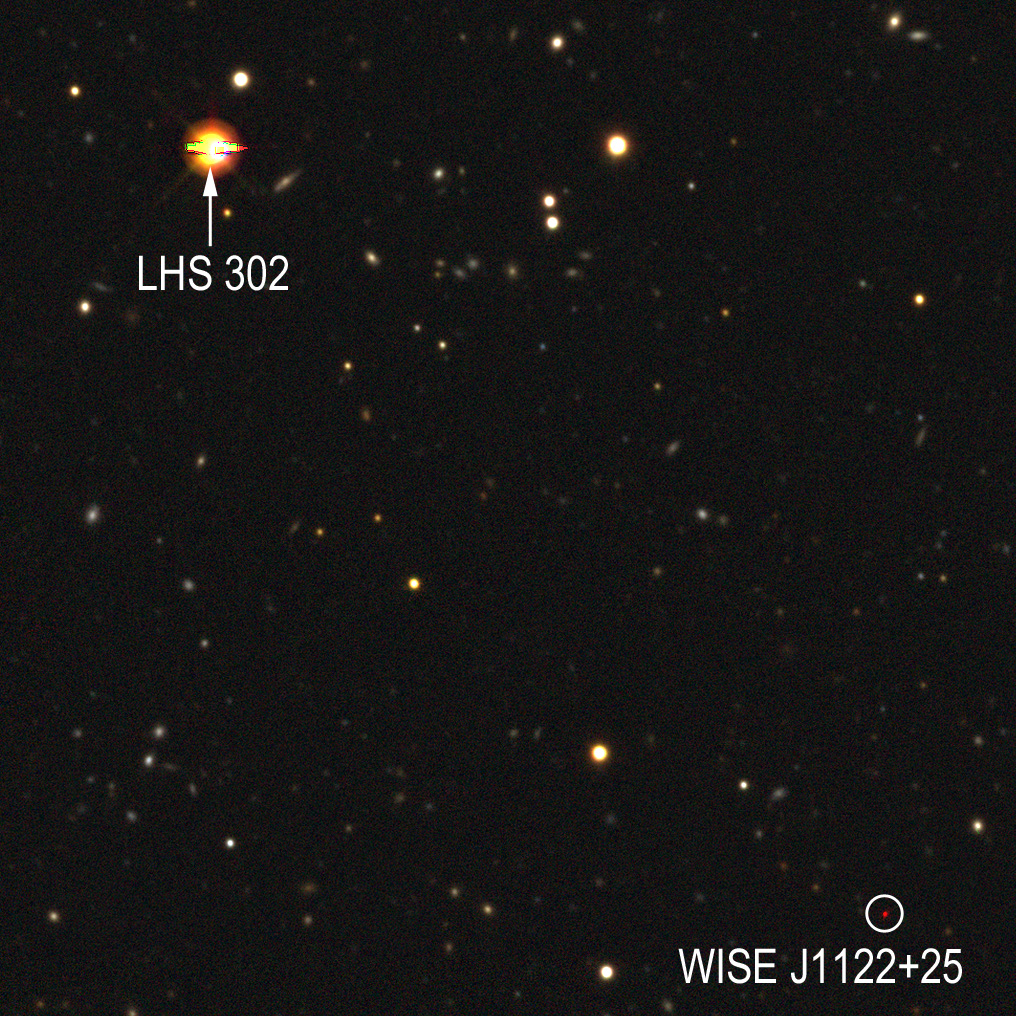
- legacy surveys image of LHS 302 (upper left) and WISE J1122+25 (faint red "star" in at the lower right inside the white circle)

Observation data Epoch J2000 Equinox J2000
- Constellation: Leo
- Right ascension: 11^{h} 22^{m} 55.50^{s}
- Declination: +25° 50′ 25.07″

Characteristics
- Evolutionary stage: brown dwarf
- Spectral type: T6

Astrometry
Proper motion (μ)	RA: –1015.62 ± 0.14 mas/yr Dec.: –322.08 ± 0.20 mas/yr
Parallax (π)	61.68±0.10 mas
Distance	52.88 ± 0.09 ly (16.21 ± 0.03 pc)

Details
Mass	16.72 ± 16.58 M_{Jup}
Radius	1.09 ± 0.16 R_{Jup}
Surface gravity (log g)	4.56 ± 0.51 cgs
Temperature	855 ± 88; 790 ±58 K
Rotation	1.95±0.03 h

Other designations
- 2MASS J11225550+2550250, CNS5 2788, TIC 230057890, WDS J11231+2554B, ** WIS 183B, WISEA J112255.54+255027.9, WISEA J112254.70+255021.9, WISEP J112254.73+255021.5, WISE J112254.72+255022.2, EQ J1122+2550

Database references
SIMBAD	data

WISEPC J112254.73+255021.5 (also called WISE J1122+25) is a brown dwarf with a spectral type T6. It co-moves with LHS 302 (LP 374-39), an M-dwarf, with a separation of around 4500 AU. WISE J1122+25 was detected in radio emission with the Arecibo radio telescope and the Very Large Array (VLA).

WISE J1122+25 was discovered with the Wide-field Infrared Survey Explorer and spectroscopy with the NASA Infrared Telescope Facility confirmed it as a T6.

== Radio emission ==
The object was first detected on 8 May 2013 with the Arecibo at 5 GHz. Five flares were detected in multiple week-long confirmation runs from December 2013 to January 2014. Observations in 2015 did not produce any detections. The magnetic field strength was estimated to be B≥1.8 kG. The pulses have a duration of 30–120 s and show a rapid frequency drift. The pulses are sporadic and have a left circular polarization fraction of 15% to 100%. Analysis of the data found an unusual short period of 17.26 minutes for the flares. This would mean that WISE J1122+25 is highly oblate and near its break-up rate. Observation with the VLA did find a higher rotation period of about 116 minutes and infrared observations with Gemini did not detect variability. This would make the rotation period more similar to rotation periods found in other brown dwarfs. The handedness of the circular polarization changed twice in the VLA observation. This is likely due to the magnetic dipole being highly misaligned with its rotation axis. The brown dwarf was observed with the Very Long Baseline Array over a time-span of one year. This observation showed that the radio emission is compact and highly circular polarized, mostly right-handed circularly polarized (RCP) with some epochs showing evidence of left-handed circularly polarized (LCP) emission. The RCP originate from the northern aurora ring and the LCP originates from the southern aurora ring. The spin axis is inclined by 86.8°±0.6°, with the north pole pointing towards earth, explaining the dominance of RCP emission. Unlike previous observations this work finds that the magnetic axis is misaligned with the spin axis by only 2.6°±0.5°, which still can explain the switch in handedness of the polarization. The timeseries shows a periodicity of 1.95±0.03 h, which is interpreted as the rotation period. Modelling showed that the light curves can be reproduced with electron cyclotron maser emission (ECME) produced in circumpolar auroral rings, similar to oval auroras in Jupiter. The observations also detected a 100% RCP flare on 2022-10-25 (2022.82). The researchers did use astrometry to look for any companions around WISE J1122+25 and exclude companions heavier than Saturn, except for very short periods, such as a hot Jupiter. The observations improved the parallax and proper motion, showing that both the brown dwarf and the star LHS 302 have the same distance and proper motion. The researchers find that WISE J1122+25 may have formed in the circumstellar disk around LHS 302 via disk fragmentation in a wide orbit of <100 AU. During stellar encounters the brown dwarf would have been disrupted, but not ejected. A scenario called "gentle disruption", which would produce the wide orbit over time. If this scenario is true, then WISE J1122+25 would have formed like some exoplanets.

== See also ==
Other T-dwarfs with detected radio emission

- SIMP J013656.5+093347.3 T2.5, planetary-mass object
- 2MASS J10475385+2124234 T6.5
- WISEPA J101905.63+652954.2 T5.5+T7.0
- WISEPA J062309.94-045624.6 T8
- 2MASS 1237+6526 T6.5
- 2MASS 2228-4310 T6
