= 2MASS J22282889−4310262 =

Brown dwarf in the constellation Grus

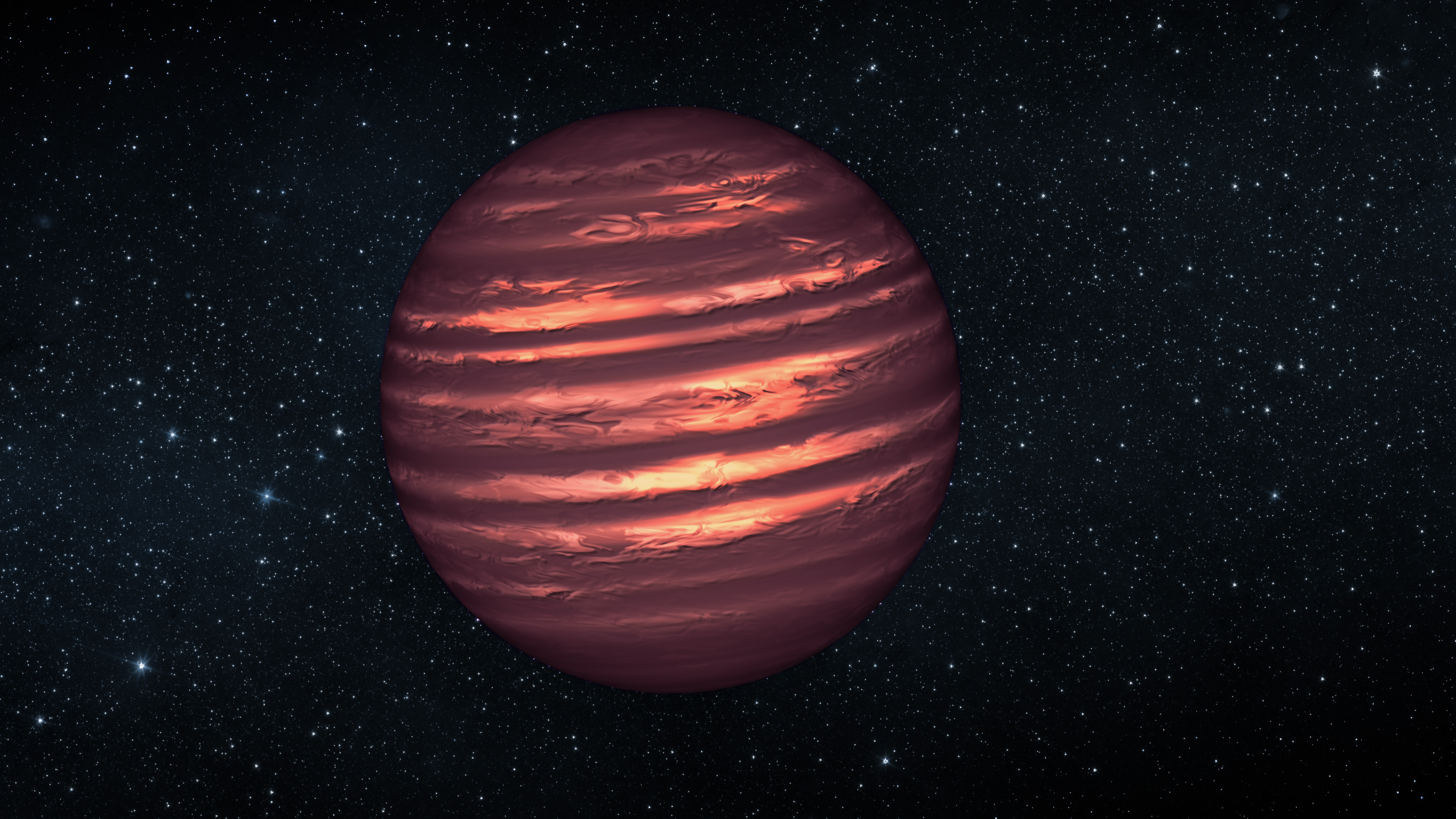
- Artist's representation of 2MASS J22282889−4310262

Observation data Epoch J2000 Equinox ICRS
- Constellation: Grus
- Right ascension: 22^{h} 28^{m} 28.894^{s}
- Declination: −43° 10′ 26.27″

Characteristics
- Spectral type: T6
- Apparent magnitude (J): 15.662
- Apparent magnitude (H): 15.363
- Apparent magnitude (K): 15.296

Astrometry
Proper motion (μ)	RA: +51.7 mas/yr Dec.: −301.3 mas/yr
Parallax (π)	94.0±7.0 mas
Distance	35 ± 3 ly (10.6 ± 0.8 pc)

Details
Radius	0.94±0.16 R_{Jup}
Surface gravity (log g)	5.0 cgs
Temperature	900 K
Rotation	1.41±0.01 h
Age	1 Gyr

Other designations
- 2MASS J22282889−4310262, WISEP J222829.00−431029.4

Database references
SIMBAD	data

2MASS J22282889−4310262 is a brown dwarf discovered by the Hubble Space Telescope and the Spitzer Space Telescope in 2013. Using Hubble and Spitzer, NASA astronomers were able to develop the most detailed 'weather map' for brown dwarfs, utilizing different wavelengths of infrared light to show changing light patterns and different layers of material in the windstorms (the layers were generated because water and methane vapors are visible at different infrared wavelengths). This observation was the first time that researchers were able to probe such variability at different altitudes in a brown dwarf. In the outer layers of its atmosphere, gases condense into raindrop-like particles made up of sand and iron which fall into the interior.

Researchers also determined that the object's temperature ranges from 1,100 to 1,300 degrees Fahrenheit (600 to 700 degrees Celsius). The brown dwarf is rotating extremely rapidly, with 1.41 hours rotation period being the smallest reliably measured rotation period of the brown dwarf as of 2021.

In 2026, a team of researchers used archival data by the Very Large Array to detect radio emission from the brown dwarf. T-dwarfs with detected radio emissions are rare and are caused by auroral processes. The radio emission at 2MASS 2228-4310 showed highly polarised bursts at intervals of around 47 and 58 minutes, or around half the rotation period. This emission comes from electron cyclotron maser emission and the magnetic field strength is constrained to around B ≥ 1.4 kG.

== See also ==
Other T-dwarfs with detected radio emission:

- SIMP J013656.5+093347.3 T2.5, planetary-mass object
- 2MASS J10475385+2124234 T6.5
- WISEPA J101905.63+652954.2 T5.5+T7.0
- WISEPA J062309.94-045624.6 T8
- 2MASS 1237+6526 T6.5
- WISEPC J112254.73+255021.5 T6
