= Gliese 414 Ab =

Sub-Neptune exoplanet orbiting Gliese 414 A

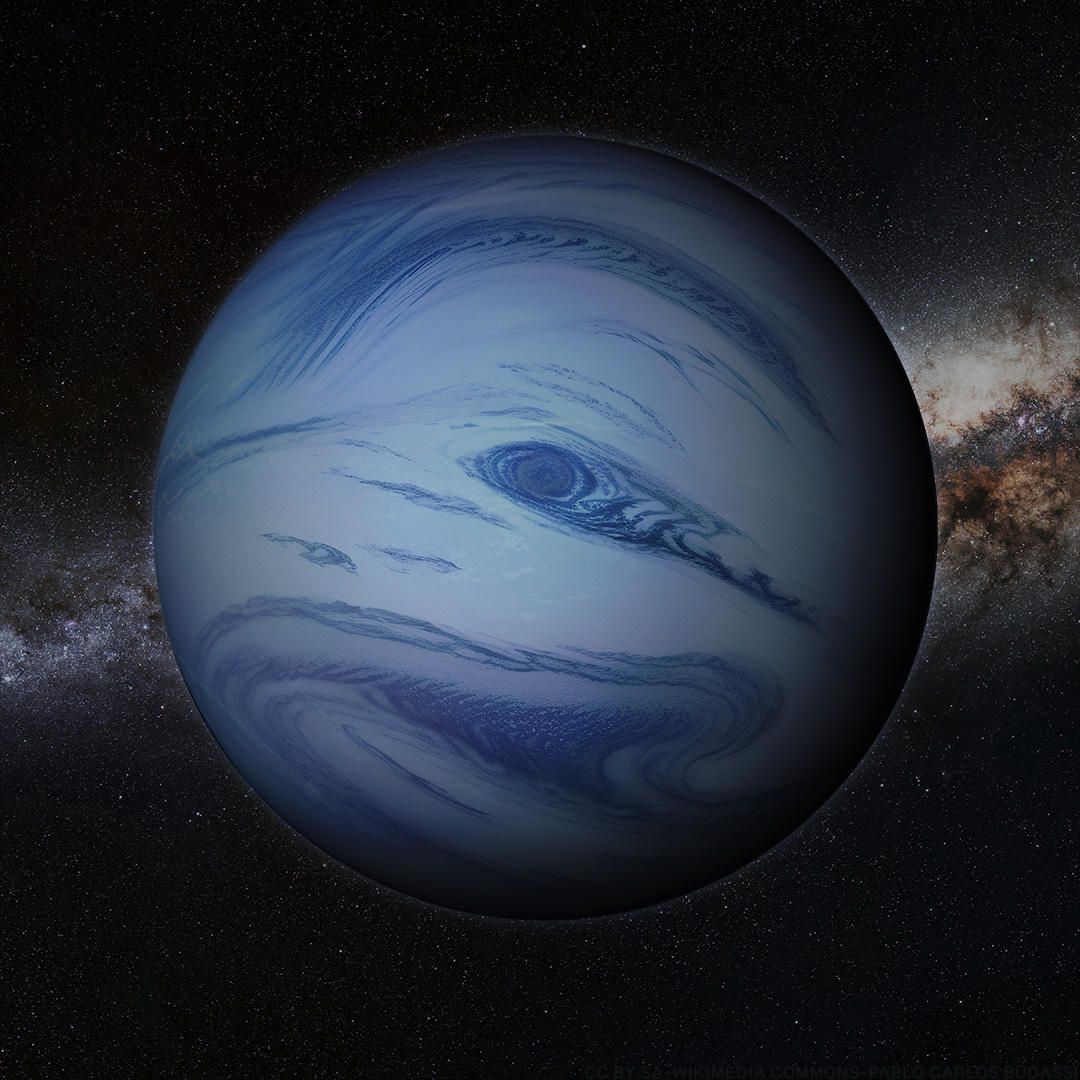
- Artistic representation of a sub-Neptune exoplanet.

Discovery
- Discovered by: Dedrick et al.
- Discovery date: 2020
- Detection method: Radial velocity

Designations
- Alternative names: HD 97101 Ab, HIP 54646 b, LHS 2367 b, G 119-60 b, TIC 9001920 b, WISEA J111105.67+302643.6 b

Orbital characteristics
- Periastron: 0.13 AU
- Apoastron: 0.34 AU
- Semi-major axis: 0.24±0.01 AU
- Eccentricity: 0.45+0.19 −0.22
- Orbital period (sidereal): 50.817+0.031 −0.03 d
- Argument of perihelion: 111°+36° −52°
- Star: Gliese 414 A

Physical characteristics
- Mean radius: 2.95+1.11 −0.91 R_{🜨}
- Mass: >7.6+2.44 −2.19 M_{🜨}
- Temperature: 308.6±33.5 K (35.5 °C (95.9 °F)) (Note: Assuming a bond albedo of 0.32.)

Gliese 414 Ab, also known as GJ 414 Ab, is a sub-Neptune exoplanet orbiting Gliese 414 A, an orange dwarf located 39 light-years from Earth, in the constellation Ursa Major. (Note: Obtained with a right ascension of 11^{h} 11^{m} 5.17^{s} and a declination of +30° 26′ 45.7″ on this website.) It is at least 7.6 times more massive than the Earth and is 3 times larger, having a diameter of 37600 km. It orbits its host star at a distance of 0.24 astronomical units (36,000,000 km), completing one revolution every 51 days. The distance of Gliese 414 A b from its star makes it to be located in the inner part of the optmistic habitable zone, and the planet has an equilibrium temperature of 35.5 °C.

== Characteristics ==
Gliese 414 Ab is classified as a sub-Neptune planet. With a diameter of 37600 km, it is about 3 times larger than Earth, but 24% smaller than Neptune. Having a minimum mass of 7.6 M_{🜨}, it is likely that it is not a rocky planet, but instead has an volatile-rich envelope. NASA Eyes on Exoplanets cites it as a Neptune-like planet.

Gliese 414 Ab completes one orbit around its star every 51 days, being located at a distance of 0.24 astronomical units (36,000,000 km). Its orbit is highly eccentric (e = 0.45), which means that the distance from its star varies from 0.13 to 0.34 astronomical units (19,400,000 km to 50,860,000 km). The orbital variation of Gliese 414 Ab causes to occasionally be located within its star's habitable zone, which has an inner limit of 0.21 AU according to a more optimistic model. According to another model, the star's habitable zone is located from 0.37 to 0.7 AU.

As it orbits close to the habitable zone, it is a warm planet, having a surface temperature estimated at around 36 °C. The margin of error of 33.5 implies that the temperature can be as high as 69.1°C, and as low as 2°C.

== Discovery ==
Gliese 414 Ab was discovered in 2020 by analyzing radial velocity data from Keck's HIRES instrument and the Automated Planet Finder at Lick Observatory, as well as photometric data from KELT.

== Host star ==
Its parent star, known as Gliese 414 A, is an orange dwarf about 70% the size of the Sun. In addition to Gliese 414 Ab, the star also hosts Gliese 414 Ac, a Super-Neptune orbiting at a distance 6 times greater, of 1.4 AU.

It also has a red dwarf companion, located at a distance of 408 AU from the main star.
