= 2MASS 1237+6526 =

Brown dwarf in the constellation Draco

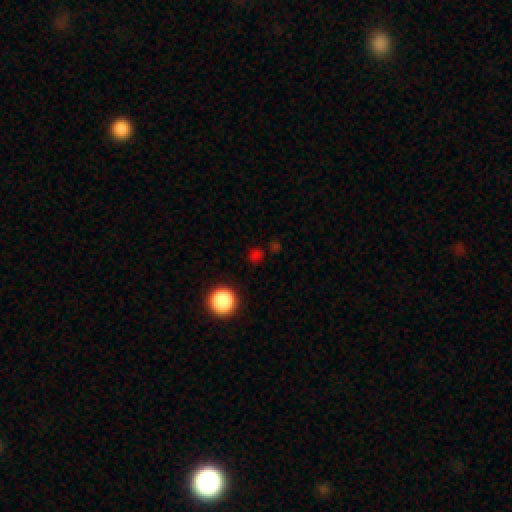
- T-type brown dwarf 2MASS 1237+6526 (faint red "star" in the center) imaged by legacy surveys

Observation data Epoch J2000 Equinox ICRS
- Constellation: Draco
- Right ascension: 12^{h} 37^{m} 39.19632^{s}
- Declination: +65° 26′ 14.8092″
- Apparent magnitude (V): +16.05

Characteristics
- Spectral type: T6.5

Astrometry
Parallax (π)	96.07±4.78 mas
Distance	34 ± 2 ly (10.4 ± 0.5 pc)

Details
Mass	0.035 M_{☉}
Radius	0.11 R_{☉}
Luminosity	6.25×10^{−6} L_{☉}
Temperature	850 K
Age	≥2-10 billion years

Other designations
- 2MASS J12373919+6526148, 2MASSI J1237392+652615, 2MASSW J1237392+652615

Database references
SIMBAD	data

2MASS J12373919+6526148 (hereafter 2MASS 1237+6526) is a brown dwarf object with late spectral type T in the constellation of Draco, nearly 34 light-years away from the Sun. It was discovered by Adam Burgasser et al. in 1999 using data from the Two Micron All-Sky Survey. It is an unusual brown dwarf in that it shows strong and sustained Hα emission. This emission has been conjectured as potentially arising from a very low-mass companion (not yet detected), possibly in the planetary mass regime.

Radio observations with the Very Large Array detected the brown dwarf. The strong detection is due to weakly circularly polarized (~35%) quiescent emission as well as pulsed emission, including a strong pulse that was highly circularly polarized (~80%). Two weaker pulses occurred before and after this strong pulse. This constrained the rotation period to 2.28+0.10
−0.09 h. 2MASS 1237+6526 may potentially show aurorae, which would be significant since extrasolar aurorae have not been detected, but this has not been conclusively demonstrated.

== Possible planetary companion ==
Burgasser et al. (2002) have inferred the presence of a low-mass companion orbiting the brown dwarf 2MASS 1237+6526. Such object would yield a mass between 3 and 12 times that of Jupiter and take nearly 4.56 hours (0.19 days) to revolve around its dim primary. If confirmed it would be one of the shortest period exoplanets and orbiting one of the faintest hosts so far. Accounting very faint luminosity of the primary (6.25/1,000,000th of Sun's luminosity), the habitable zone is located within 0.0025 astronomical units, so the putative planet could likely retain great amounts of water and ammonia. Moreover, both the objects would appear the same size.

The 2MASS 1237+6526 planetary system
Companion (in order from star)	Mass	Semimajor axis (AU)	Orbital period (days)	Eccentricity	Inclination (°)	Radius
b (unconfirmed)	≥3-12 M_{J}	≤0.003	≥0.19	0?	—	—

== See also ==
Other T-dwarfs with detected radio emission:

- SIMP J013656.5+093347.3 T2.5, planetary-mass object
- 2MASS J10475385+2124234 T6.5
- WISEPC J112254.73+255021.5 T6
- WISEPA J101905.63+652954.2 T5.5+T7.0
- WISEPA J062309.94-045624.6 T8
- 2MASS 2228-4310 T6
