= SIMP J013656.5+093347 =

Planetary-mass object in the constellation Pisces

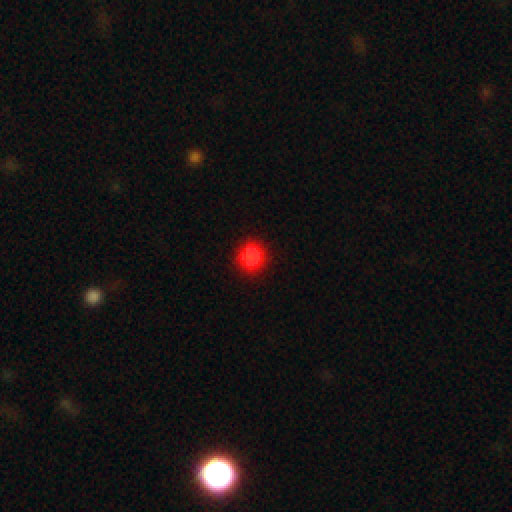
- SIMP0136 with the legacy surveys. For a planetary-mass object it is relatively bright (apparent J≈13.4).

Observation data Epoch J2000 Equinox ICRS
- Constellation: Pisces
- Right ascension: 01^{h} 36^{m} 56.56^{s}
- Declination: +09° 33′ 47.3″

Characteristics
- Spectral type: T2.5
- Apparent magnitude (i): 20.42±0.06
- Apparent magnitude (z): 16.01±0.02
- Apparent magnitude (J): 13.455±0.030
- Apparent magnitude (H): 12.771±0.032
- Apparent magnitude (K): 12.562±0.024

Astrometry
Radial velocity (R_{v})	12.3±0.8 km/s
Proper motion (μ)	RA: +1238.244 mas/yr Dec.: −16.156 mas/yr
Parallax (π)	163.4478±0.4629 mas
Distance	19.95 ± 0.06 ly (6.12 ± 0.02 pc)

Details
Mass	12.7±1.0 M_{Jup}
Radius	1.22±0.01 R_{Jup}
Surface gravity (log g)	4.31±0.03 cgs
Temperature	1243 K
Metallicity	0.18±0.01
Rotation	2.406±0.008 hours
Rotational velocity (v sin i)	52.8+1.1 −1.0 km/s
Age	200±50 Myr

Other designations
- 2MASS J01365662+0933473; IPMS J013656.57+093347.3; IBIS J013656.57+093347.3

Database references
SIMBAD	data

SIMP J013656.5+093347 (abbreviated SIMP0136) is a planetary mass object at 19.9 light-years from Earth in the constellation Pisces. It belongs to the spectral class T2.5 and its position shifts due to its proper motion of about 1.24 arcseconds annually.

== Physical properties ==
In 2017, it was announced that the object's mass may be as low as 12.7 Jupiter masses and might be considered a rogue planet rather than a brown dwarf as it seems to be a member of the relatively young, 200 million-year-old Carina-Near stellar moving group.

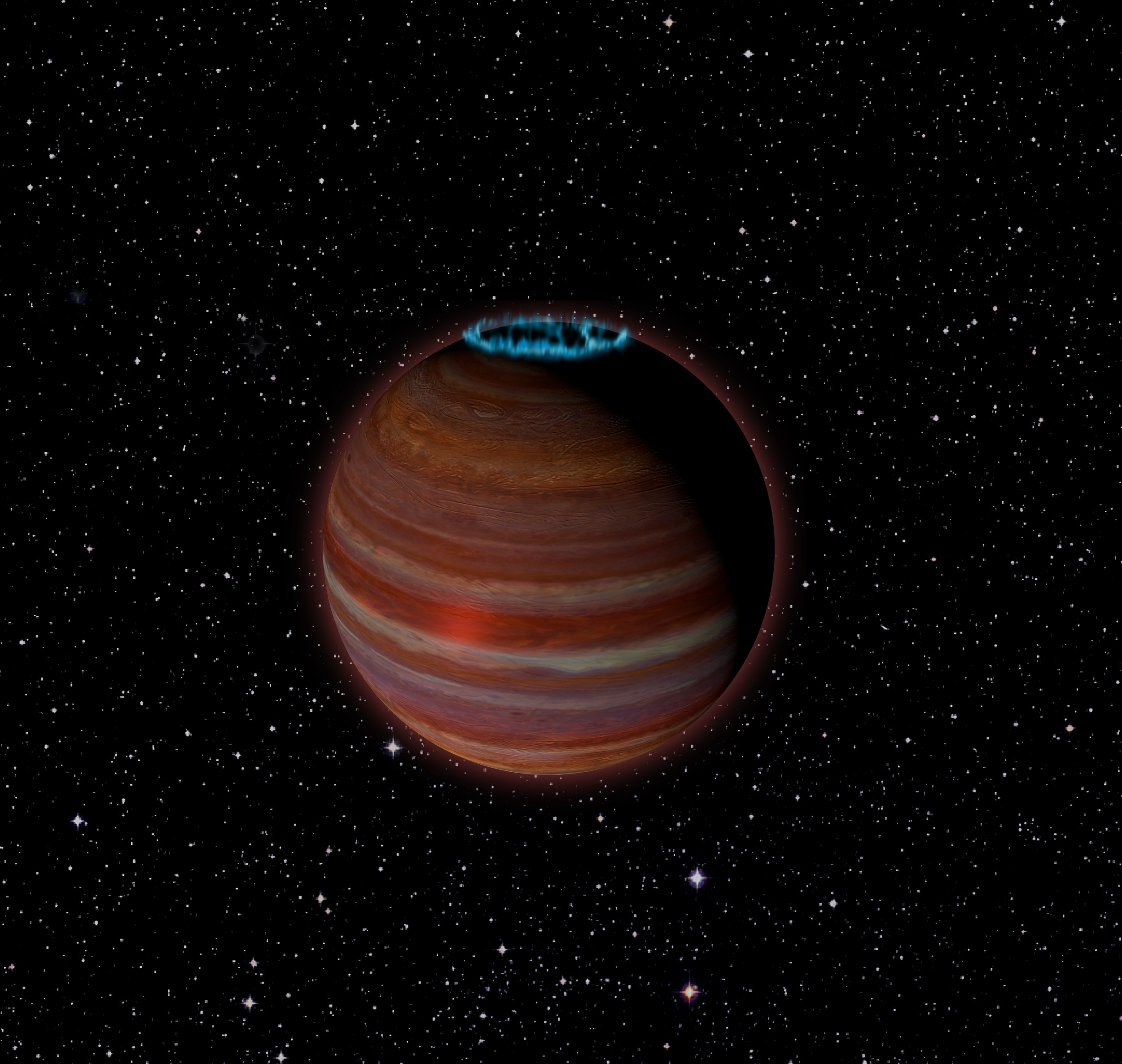
Artist's impression of the planet and its auroras

In 2018 astronomers said "Detecting SIMP J01365663+0933473 with the VLA through its auroral radio emission, also means that we may have a new way of detecting exoplanets, including the elusive rogue ones not orbiting a parent star ... This particular object is exciting because studying its magnetic dynamo mechanisms can give us new insights on how the same type of mechanisms can operate in extrasolar planets – planets beyond our Solar System ... We think these mechanisms can work not only in brown dwarfs, but also in both gas giant and terrestrial planets." During the observation with the VLA only one pulse was detected for SIMP0136. The magnetic flux of SIMP0136 was estimated to be 3.2 kG. In 2025 significant auroral activity was detected on SIMP0136. A re-analysis of the JWST data found that the atmosphere showed a temperature inversion at the stratosphere, caused by auroral heating, driven by electron precipitation. The methane and carbon monoxide abundance were found to be in chemical disequelibrium and methane abundance decreases at the temperature inversion. Observations with JWST/NIRSpec and NIRISS were used to find a transition of methane absorption to methane emission at low pressures (high altitudes). A similar methane emission was found previously only in CWISEP J1935−1546. This transition is explained with auroral heating from electron precipitation.

In 2017 the rotational velocity and radial velocity were measured. It was found that SIMP0136 can be seen almost equator-on with an inclination of 80 ±12°.

=== Weather and clouds ===
This planetary-mass object provided the first evidence for periodic variability flux variations among T dwarfs. A team observed this object with the 1.8-m Perkins Telescope Observatory near Flagstaff, Arizona in 2015. SIMP0136 was observed in 15 nights, spread out over 90 days. The variation has been interpreted as a signature of weather patterns coming in and out of view over the object's 2.4h rotation period. The shape of this lightcurve evolves over timescales of days, which has been interpreted as a sign of evolution of the cloud patterns in its atmosphere. In 2016 a phase shift between Spitzer and Hubble observations was noticed, which was measured to be 33.4 ±3.9°. In 2023 a team found that SIMP0136 has patchy forsterite (Mg_{2}SiO_{4}) clouds above an iron cloud deck. This patchy cloud layer covers between 69% and 72% of the surface of the object. In 2024 a team re-analysed the 2015 data and detected a phase shift between the J-band and K_{s}-band of 39.9+3.6
−1.1°. The team concluded that the phase shift can be explained with at least two different patchy cloud layers. The J- and K_{s}-bands both probe different layers of the atmosphere. A study with JWST NIRSpec and MIRI observed two rotations and were used to study the object in detail. The study found that the variability comes from different parts of the atmosphere, depending on the wavelength. A signal deep within the atmosphere is thought to be connected to patchy iron clouds. Another signal higher up could come from patchy silicate clouds. A third signal comes from high above the clouds and is connected to hot spots, which could represent the aurora or upwelling of hot gas. Some of the light curves produced can only be explained with changing carbon chemistry. In a re-analysis the variability was found to be caused by changes of the temperature profile above 10 mbar. The effective temperature changed from 1243 K at the coldest to 1248 K at the hottest, which is an byamplitude of 5 K (or 5°C; 9°F). The spectrum required patchy silicate clouds, which were found not to be the primary cause of variability; the variability was found to be caused by magnetic and thermodynamic mechanisms. The changes of temperature also correlated with a change in abundance of carbon dioxide and hydrogen sulfide, which may suggest chemical changes driven by dynamics and storms.

== See also ==
Other planetary-mass objects:

- OTS 44
- PSO J318.5−22
- WISE 0855−0714
- 2MASS J11193254−1137466

Other T-dwarfs with detected radio emission:

- 2MASS J10475385+2124234 T6.5
- WISEPC J112254.73+255021.5 T6
- WISEPA J101905.63+652954.2 T5.5+T7.0
- WISEPA J062309.94-045624.6 T8
- 2MASS 1237+6526 T6.5
- 2MASS 2228-4310 T6
