= Gliese 2 =

Star in the constellation of Andromeda

Observation data Epoch J2000 Equinox J2000
- Constellation: Andromeda
- Right ascension: 00^{h} 05^{m} 10.8892^{s}
- Declination: +45° 47′ 11.640″
- Apparent magnitude (V): 9.949

Characteristics
- Evolutionary stage: main sequence
- Spectral type: dM1.8
- U−B color index: +1.18
- B−V color index: +1.50

Astrometry
Radial velocity (R_{v})	−0.39±0.09 km/s
Proper motion (μ)	RA: 870.753(57) mas/yr Dec.: −151.267(36) mas/yr
Parallax (π)	86.9567±0.0407 mas
Distance	37.51 ± 0.02 ly (11.500 ± 0.005 pc)
Absolute magnitude (M_{V})	+9.65

Details
Mass	0.50 M_{☉}
Radius	0.508±0.027 R_{☉}
Luminosity	0.041 L_{☉}
Surface gravity (log g)	4.76 cgs
Temperature	3,674 K
Metallicity [Fe/H]	−0.14 dex
Rotation	15.37±0.09 days
Rotational velocity (v sin i)	2.76 km/s
Age	<1 Gyr

Other designations
- BD+44 4548, GJ 2, HIP 428, ADS 48 F, CCDM J00057+4548F, WDS J00057+4549F, G 171-39, LFT 6, LHS 1014, LTT 10011, NLTT 139

Database references
SIMBAD	data
ARICNS	data

Gliese 2 is a red dwarf star in the constellation Andromeda. The star is located at 11.5 parsecs (38 light-years) from Earth. It is often associated with the binary star system ADS 48, with a similar distance and proper motions with this system, suggesting both may be gravitationally bound. However, it is moving faster than the escape velocity of the system, and its velocity is much faster than expected for a bound star, and thus it is not considered a companion of ADS 48.
