= WISEPA J062309.94-045624.6 =

Cold brown dwarf with radio emission

WISE J0623−0456
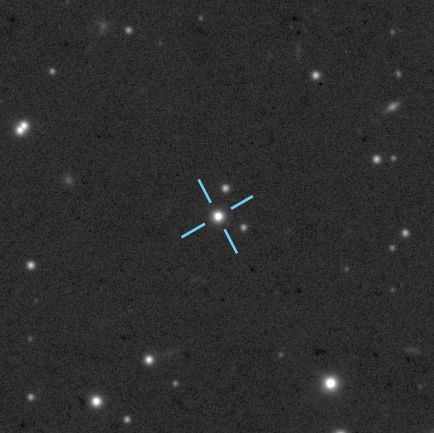
- Very Large Telescope image of WISE J0623−0456

Observation data Epoch J2000 Equinox J2000
- Constellation: Monoceros
- Right ascension: 06^{h} 23^{m} 09.68^{s}
- Declination: −04° 56′ 23.52″

Characteristics
- Evolutionary stage: brown dwarf
- Spectral type: T8
- Variable type: rotational variable

Astrometry
Proper motion (μ)	RA: -906.3 ± 1.8 mas/yr Dec.: 168.8 ± 1.6 mas/yr
Parallax (π)	86.5±1.7 mas
Distance	37.7 ± 0.7 ly (11.6 ± 0.2 pc)

Details
Mass	13.18+31.26 −9.44 M_{J} 12.28 ±13.06 M_{Jup}
Radius	0.78+0.17 −0.13 R_{J} 1.11 ±0.14 R_{Jup}
Luminosity (bolometric)	10^{−5.755+0.060 −0.049} L_{☉}
Surface gravity (log g)	4.70+0.47 −0.42 cgs
Temperature	743+53 −51 K 624 ±40 K
Metallicity	−0.32+0.18 −0.16
Rotation	1.912 ± 0.005 hours
Rotational velocity (v sin i)	60+70 −55 km/s >63 km/s
Age	738+2701 −592 Myr

Other designations
- CNS5 1581, WISEA J062309.92−045624.5, WISEP J062309.94−045624.6, EQ J0623−0456

Database references
SIMBAD	data

WISEPA J062309.94−045624.6 (also called WISE J0623−0456) is a brown dwarf of spectral type T8. It is the coldest, and latest spectral type brown dwarf observed to produce radio emission (as of May 2026).

WISE J0623−0456 was discovered in 2011 with the Wide-field Infrared Survey Explorer and a spectrum with the NASA Infrared Telescope Facility confirmed it as a T8-dwarf. WISE J0623−0456 was identified as a radio source with the Australian SKA Pathfinder. Follow-up observations were carried out with the Australia Telescope Compact Array (ATCA) and MeerKAT. The source showed a double-peaked pulsed emission, with a period of 1.889 ± 0.018 hours in ATCA and 1.912 ± 0.005 hours in MeerKAT. The source has a radio luminosity of 10^{14.8} erg s^{−1} Hz^{−1} and is comparable to other radio bright ultracool dwarfs with a similar spectral type. The radio emission of WISE J0623−0456 is strongly circularly polarized and periodic. The researchers therefore think that the radio emission comes from electron cyclotron maser instability (ECMI), which is connected to aurora in ultracool dwarfs. The researchers find that the magnetic field has a strength of at least B > 0.71 kG. Another work finds that the shape of the lightcurve can be reproduced by active field lines (AFLs). This work also found that the brown dwarf is likely seen pole-on. The rotation and magnetic axes are misaligned significantly (similar to Uranus and Neptune) and the magnetic cycle is likely longer than 6 months. M- and L-dwarfs can produce the observed radio luminosities on their own, but cooler T- and Y-dwarfs don't have the necessary corona to produce the radio emission. The alternative is that the plasma is fed to the magnetosphere from a companion, similar to the role of Io for the aurora on Jupiter.

== See also ==
Other T-dwarfs with detected radio emission

- SIMP J013656.5+093347.3 T2.5, planetary-mass object
- 2MASS J10475385+2124234 T6.5
- WISEPC J112254.73+255021.5 T6
- WISEPA J101905.63+652954.2 T5.5+T7.0
- 2MASS 1237+6526 T6.5
- 2MASS 2228-4310 T6
