= Gauribidanur Radio Observatory =

Indian observatory

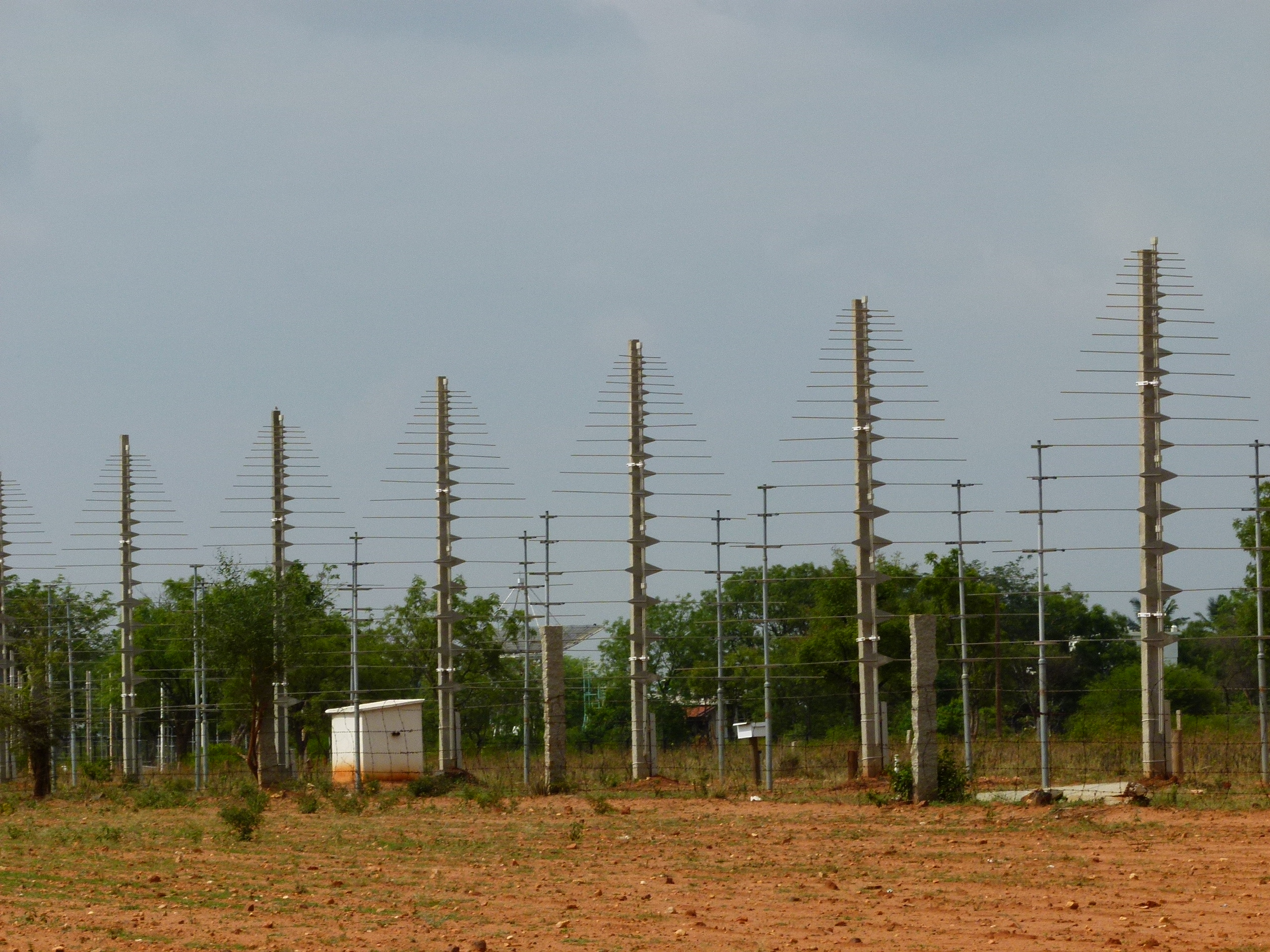
- Organization: Indian Institute of Astrophysics; Raman Research Institute
- Location: Gauribidanur, Karnataka, India
- Coordinates: 13°36′N 77°26′E
- Established: 1976
- Website: www.iiap.res.in/centers/radio
- Telescopes: Gauribidanur Radio Heliograph; Gauribidanur Telescope
- Related media on Commons

The Gauribidanur Radio Observatory is a radio telescope observatory located at Gauribidanur, near Bengaluru. It is operated jointly by Raman Research Institute and the Indian Institute of Astrophysics. The observatory has been in operation since 1976.

== Location ==
The Gauribidanur Observatory is located at Gauribidanur in Chikkaballapur district(Latitude:13.60° N; Longitude:77.44° E), 100 km north of Bengaluru.

== Science and observation ==
The observatory’s solar observations at decameter (~100 MHz) and metre (~20 MHz) wavelengths date back to the early 1950s at Kodaikanal, using Yagi antenna arrays under the Kodaikanal Yale project. The Gauribidanur site was established in 1976 to install the Gauribidanur Telescope, a 1000‑dipole array in a T-shaped layout and has been continuously monitoring the Sun and Pulsars in radio frequencies since that time.

In 2024, researchers at the Gauribidanur observatory demonstrated that low-cost commercial dish TV antennas operating at 11.2 GHz could be repurposed to measure the Sun’s magnetic field in the solar chromosphere, bridging a critical observational gap between the photosphere and corona. According to Prof. R. Ramesh of the Indian Institute of Astrophysics, these daily radio observations. Unlike optical ones restricted to eclipses, allow continuous tracking of solar magnetic fields, essential for understanding and forecasting coronal mass ejections (CMEs) and space weather.

The observatory made multiple observations of the large scale solar storms in conjunction with the Aditya L1 spacecraft. On May 27, 2024, it detected a CME-driven shock forming at a distance of approximately 130,000 kilometers above the Sun’s surface, traveling at nearly 1,700 kilometers per second.This is the closest distance from the Sun at which such a shock and its associated radio burst have been unambiguously detected.

A few observations with the array have been the first two-dimensional images of radio emission from slowly varying discrete sources in the outer solar corona, an all-sky survey of radio sources at 34.5 MHz in the declination range -30° S to 60° N, and a low frequency carbon recombination lines in astrophysical sources. Studies have also been done of gaseous remnants of exploding stars and the apparently vacant space between members of a cluster of galaxies. Currently, the studies are targeted at pulsars.

== Facilities ==
The Gauribidanur Observatory has a 6-meter radio telescope, a radio heliograph, a high resolution radio spectrograph and a gravitational laboratory.

=== Gauribidanur Telescope ===
The Gauribidanur Telescope is a decameter wave radio telescope. It consists of 1000 dipoles arranged in a "T" configuration. It consists of 1.4 km East-West Arm and a 0.5 km South Arm.

=== Gauribidanur Radio Heliograph ===
The Gauribidanur Radio Heliograph is a radioheliograph used to obtain two dimensional pictures of the outer solar corona at frequencies from 40-150 MHz. It has been operating since 1997. It consists of 192 log-periodic dipoles arranged in a "T" configuration.

== See also ==
- List of astronomical observatories
