= WD 0810−353 =

White dwarf star in the constellation Puppis

- Location of WD 0810−353 (circled)

Observation data Epoch J2000.0 Equinox J2000.0
- Constellation: Puppis
- Right ascension: 08^{h} 12^{m} 27.06600^{s}
- Declination: −35° 29′ 43.3241″
- Apparent magnitude (V): 14.469

Characteristics
- Evolutionary stage: white dwarf
- Spectral type: DAH

Astrometry
| Radial velocity (R_{v}) | 83±140 km/s |
| Proper motion (μ) | RA: −365.479 mas/yr Dec.: −329.204 mas/yr |
| Parallax (π) | 89.5064±0.0155 mas |
| Distance | 36.439 ± 0.006 ly (11.172 ± 0.002 pc) |

Details
| Mass | 0.63 M_{☉} |
| Radius | 0.01 R_{☉} |
| Luminosity | 0.00017 L_{☉} |
| Surface gravity (log g) | 8.09 cgs |
| Temperature | 6,093 K |
| Age | 2.7 (Note: This is the "cooling age", the length of time since the object became a white dwarf.) Gyr |

Other designations
- UPM J0812−3529, GJ 11192, WD 0810−353, TIC 145863747, 2MASS J08122707−3529433

Database references
| SIMBAD | data |

WD 0810−353 (UPM J0812−3529) is a white dwarf currently located 36 light-years (11 parsecs) from the Solar System. Based on unreliable radial velocity measurements, this stellar remnant was predicted to approach the Solar System 29,000 years from now at a distance of around 0.15 parsecs, 0.49 light-years or 31,000 AU from the Sun, crossing well within the proposed boundaries of the Oort cloud. However, this star is in fact moving away from the Solar System and will not approach.

== Characteristics ==
WD 1810−353 is a white dwarf of spectral type DAH with a very strong magnetic field, perhaps as strong as 30 MG. It has a mass of 0.63 M_{☉} and an age of 2.7 billion years; its effective temperature is 6,093 K or 6,273 K. It is a dim object with an apparent magnitude of 14.5. Its motion perpendicular to the line of sight is considerable; it is consistently listed as a high proper motion star.

== Disproven flyby ==
Both the minimum approach distance and the timing of the star's closest flyby depend strongly on the value of the radial velocity. Based on a radal velocity measurement from the Gaia DR3 database, WD 1810−353 is moving towards the Solar System at a velocity of −373.74±8.18 km/s, which together with its proper motions would imply it would approach the Solar System 29,000 years from now at a distance of around 0.15 parsecs (0.49 light-years, 31,000 AU), crossing well within the proposed boundaries of the Oort cloud. Considering the values from Gaia DR3, WD 1810−353 would traverse the Oort cloud, disturbing the population of comets there. Given its mass such an encounter like Gliese 710, would cause a negligible orbital change to the Pluto system and Neptune resonant object. However, this radial velocity was cast in doubt by a 2022 paper, as Gaia does not have the software necessary to accurately derive radial velocity measurements for white dwarfs from the raw data. In this study, an even more extreme radial velocity of −4,248±457 km/s was suggested, implying a closest approach in 2,600 years at a distance of 0.015 parsecs (0.049 ly; 3,100 AU). The extremely high radial velocity could suggest that WD 0810−353 formed after a Type Ia supernova. However, those values, and the flyby as a whole, were disproven in a 2023 study, which find WD 1810−353 is instead moving away from the Solar System, at a velocity of +83±140 km/s.
