= G 107-69/70 =

Nearby Quadruple star system in the constellation Lynx

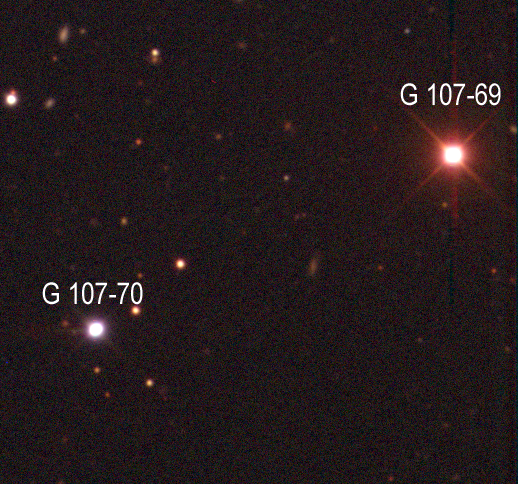
- KPNO 4.0 meter Mayall telescope image of the quadruple system G 107-69/70

Observation data Epoch J2000.0 Equinox ICRS
- Constellation: Lynx
- G 107-69
- Right ascension: 07^{h} 30^{m} 42.7784^{s}
- Declination: +48° 11′ 58.5889″
- Apparent magnitude (V): 13.2
- G 107-70
- Right ascension: 07^{h} 30^{m} 46.9572^{s}
- Declination: +48° 10′ 06.2765″
- Apparent magnitude (V): 15.00

Characteristics
- Spectral type: M4.5+DA+DA

Astrometry

G 107-69
Radial velocity (R_{v})	−56.486±0.0035 km/s
Proper motion (μ)	RA: −201.282±0.027 mas/yr Dec.: −1,272.162±0.020 mas/yr
Parallax (π)	88.7231±0.0298 mas
Distance	36.76 ± 0.01 ly (11.271 ± 0.004 pc)

Details

G 107-69A
Mass	0.17 M_{☉}
Radius	0.21 R_{☉}
Luminosity	0.003 L_{☉}
Surface gravity (log g)	5.0±0.13 cgs
Temperature	3,200±25 K
Metallicity [Fe/H]	−0.15±0.09 dex

G 107-69B
Mass	0.08 M_{☉}

G 107-70A
Mass	0.634±0.01 M_{☉}

G 107-70B
Mass	0.599±0.01 M_{☉}

Other designations
- WDS J07307+4813, 2MASS J07304735+4810275, 2MASS J07304280+4811599 GJ 275.2, LHS 229, LHS 230, EGGR 52, WD 0727+482

Database references
SIMBAD	G 107-69
- G 107-70

Hubble WFPC2 observation show part of the orbital motion of G 107-70 between 1997 and 1999.

G 107-69/70 is a quadruple system, consisting of the astrometric binary G 107-69 and the resolved binary G 107-70. The system is 36.76 light years (11.27 parsecs) from Earth. G 107-69 and G 107-70 are separated by 103.2 arcseconds, or 1163 astronomical units (AU).

G 107-69A is a red dwarf star with a spectral type of M4.5 and a mass of about 0.17 M_{☉}. G 107-69B has a mass of about 0.08 M_{☉} or 84 M_{J}. The binary has a period of 0.94 years and a predicted separation of about 50 mas. From its mass G 107-69B could be either a low-mass red dwarf star or a brown dwarf.

G 107-70 (also called WD 0727+482) is a pair of white dwarfs, with both having similar mass, brightness and atmospheric composition. The binary was first partially resolved in 1976. Later Nelan et al. fully resolved the orbit of this binary with Hubble's Fine Guidance Sensor and found an orbital period of 18.84±0.02 years and a semi-major axis of 663.62±0.79 mas. At a distance of 11.27 parsecs the semi-major axis is about 7.5 AU.

By resolving the orbit of the G 107-70 system Nelan et al. were able to calculate the dynamical mass of each component: G 107-70A has a mass of 0.634±0.01 M_{☉} and G 107-70B has a mass of 0.599±0.01 M_{☉}. Both white dwarfs have a spectral type of DA, which indicates an atmosphere dominated by hydrogen.

== See also ==
- Gliese 318, suspected to be the closest double white dwarf, which would make G 107-70 the second closest double white dwarf
- Capella, is another nearby quadruple system
