= ADS 48 =

Triple star system in the constellation of Andromeda

Observation data Epoch J2000 Equinox ICRS
- Constellation: Andromeda
- ADS 48 A
- Right ascension: 00^{h} 05^{m} 41.0219^{s}
- Declination: +45° 48′ 43.545″
- Apparent magnitude (V): 8.826
- ADS 48 B
- Right ascension: 00^{h} 05^{m} 41.0028^{s}
- Declination: +45° 48′ 37.354″
- Apparent magnitude (V): 8.995

Characteristics

ADS 48 A
- Evolutionary stage: main sequence
- Spectral type: K6V
- B−V color index: +1.344

ADS 48 B
- Evolutionary stage: main sequence
- Spectral type: M0.5V
- B−V color index: +1.345

Astrometry
Radial velocity (R_{v})	1.49±0.1 km/s
Proper motion (μ)	RA: 887.48±1.02 mas/yr Dec.: −152.02±1.04 mas/yr
Parallax (π)	88.44±1.56 mas
Distance	36.9 ± 0.7 ly (11.3 ± 0.2 pc)
Absolute magnitude (M_{V})	+7.93

Orbit
Period (P)	557±120 yr
Semi-major axis (a)	74±10 AU
Eccentricity (e)	0.19±0.08
Inclination (i)	54.3±2.3°
Longitude of the node (Ω)	12.5±2.8°
Periastron epoch (T)	2110±30
Argument of periastron (ω) (secondary)	256±31°

Details

ADS 48 A
Mass	0.50 M_{☉}
Radius	0.55 R_{☉}
Luminosity	0.077 L_{☉}
Temperature	4,104 K

ADS 48 B
Mass	0.53 M_{☉}
Radius	0.52 R_{☉}
Luminosity	0.072 L_{☉}
Temperature	4,139 K

Other designations
- HD 38, HIP 473, GJ 4, CCDM J00057+4548AB, WDS J00057+4549AB
- ADS 48 A: HD 38A, SAO 36046, GC 71, GJ 4 A, CCDM J00057+4548A, WDS J00057+4549A
- ADS 48 B: HD 38B, SAO 36048, GC 72, GJ 4 B, CCDM J00057+4548B, WDS J00057+4549B

Database references
SIMBAD	AB
- A
- B

ADS 48 is a binary system in the constellation of Andromeda.

The components have apparent visual magnitudes of 8.826 and 8.995. Component A is a K-type main-sequence star, while component B is an M-type main-sequence star (red dwarf). The stars are orbiting with a period of 550 years and a separation of 74 AU.

Multiple stars lie close to ADS 48 in the line of sight, and have been considered components C, D and E of the system, but are background objects. ADS 48 F (Gliese 2) is at a similar distance from the pair and share similar proper motions, but is moving faster than the escape velocity of the pair and thus is not gravitationally bound. The existence of an unseen companion of 0.05 M_{☉} has also been proposed, but this was refuted.
