= Super-Neptune =

Planet larger than Neptune but smaller than Saturn

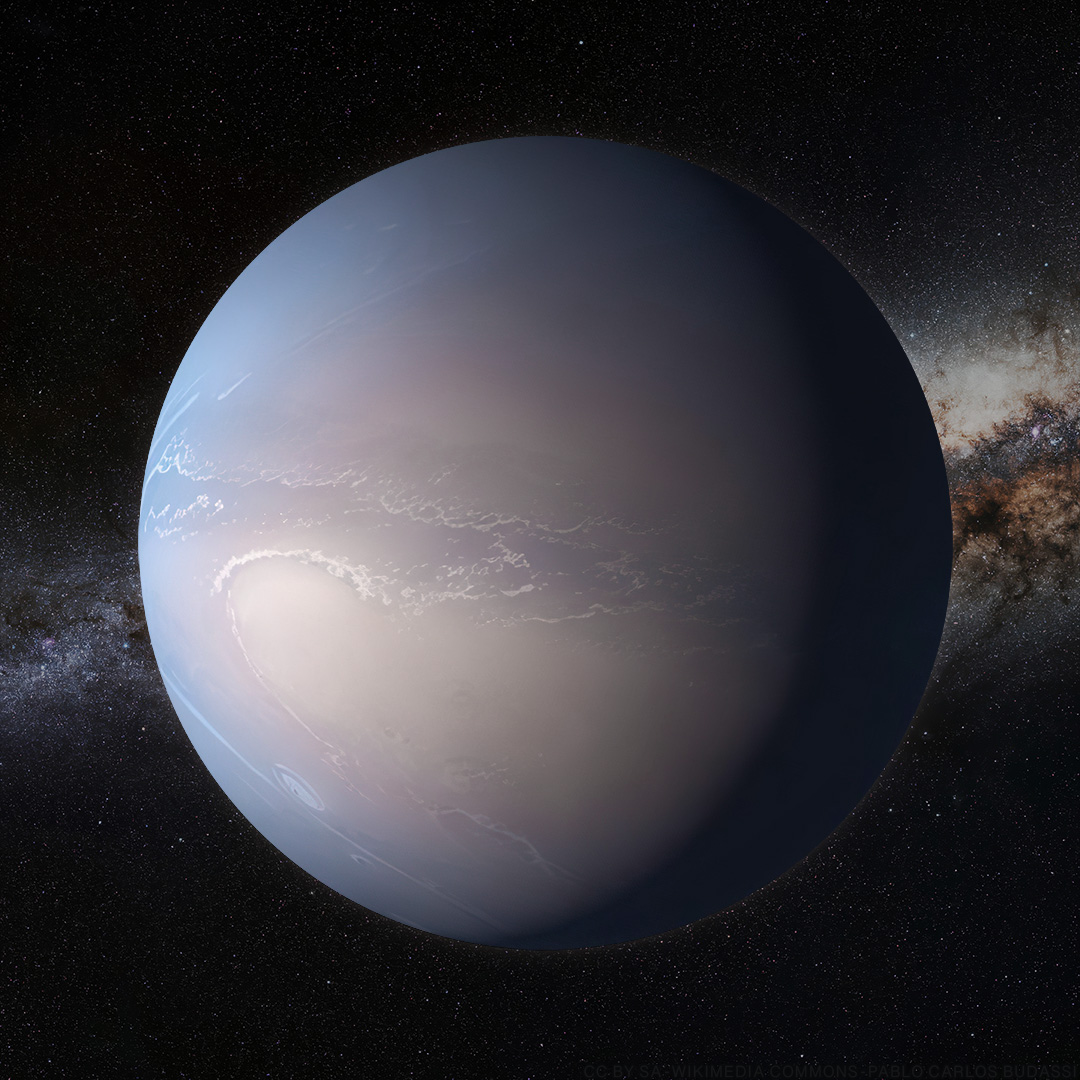
Artist's interpretation of a super-Neptune

Super-Neptunes, also known as sub-Saturns, are a rare population of exoplanets that have properties between that of Neptune and Saturn (20-100 M_{🜨}, 4-8 R_{🜨}, 0.687-1.64 g/cm^{3}). According to the core-accretion model of planet formation, most planets that reach a ~20 M_{🜨} threshold are expected to rapidly expand to gas giant sizes (≥100 M_{🜨}) in a mechanism known as runaway gas accretion. Despite this, Super-Neptunes sit between this bimodal distribution of sub-Neptunes and gas giants, failing to either begin or fully complete runaway accretion.

Planet formation occurs over a period of ~10^{6} years, with runaway accretion occurring only in the last 10^{5} years. The average lifespan of a protoplanetary disk, which contains the material that becomes a planet, is between 10^{5}-10^{7} years before stellar activity quickly disperses the disk. Therefore, one theory is that Super-Neptunes are failed gas giants that were quenched of material during their runaway phase before they could reach larger sizes.

Conversely, the delayed onset hypothesis argues that the true mass threshold for runaway accretion is actually ~100 M_{🜨}, meaning that Super-Neptunes –and even Saturn– never actually underwent runaway accretion according to this theory.
