= DENIS J081730.0−615520 =

Star in the constellation Carina

- Location of DENIS J081730.0−615520 in the constellation Carina

Observation data Epoch J2000 Equinox ICRS
- Constellation: Carina
- Right ascension: 08^{h} 17^{m} 29.99888^{s}
- Declination: −61° 55′ 15.6586″

Characteristics
- Spectral type: T6
- Apparent magnitude (J): 13.613±0.024
- J−H color index: 0.087 ± 0.039
- J−K color index: 0.093 ± 0.049

Astrometry
Radial velocity (R_{v})	6.1 ± 0.5 km/s
Proper motion (μ)	RA: −156.451(507) mas/yr Dec.: 1,099.366(503) mas/yr
Parallax (π)	191.8362±0.4186 mas
Distance	17.00 ± 0.04 ly (5.21 ± 0.01 pc)

Details
Radius	0.94±0.16 R_{Jup}
Surface gravity (log g)	5.0±0.1 cgs
Temperature	1004±91 K
Rotation	2.8±0.2 hours
Rotational velocity (v sin i)	22.5±0.9 km/s
Age	1 Gyr

Other designations
- DENIS J081730.0−615520, 2MASS J08173001-6155158, WISEPA J081729.74−615504.1

Database references
SIMBAD	data

DENIS J081730.0−615520 (also known as 2MASS 08173001−6155158) is a T-type brown dwarf 17 light-years (5.2 parsecs) away in the constellation Carina. It was discovered by Etienne Artigau and his colleagues in April 2010. The brown dwarf belongs to the T6 spectral class, with a photosphere temperature of about 1000 K. It has a mass of about 15 M_{J} (Jupiter masses) or about 1.5% the mass of the Sun.

DENIS J081730.0-615520 is the fourth-nearest isolated T dwarf to the Sun (after UGPS J0722−0540, WISE 1741+2553, and WISE 1506+7027) and the eighth-nearest (also after Luhman 16B, ε Indi Bab and SCR 1845-6357B) if one takes into account T dwarfs in multiple star systems. It is also the brightest T dwarf in the sky (in the J-band); it had been missed before due to its proximity to the galactic plane.

DENIS J081730.0−615520 was observed with Gemini South. This spectrum did result to the first detection of molecular hydrogen (H_{2}) and the first detection of hydrogen sulfide (H_{2}S) in an extrasolar atmosphere. Other molecules detected in the atmosphere of this brown dwarf are methane (CH_{4}), water vapor (H_{2}O), carbon monoxide (CO) and ammonia (NH_{3}). The detection of H_{2} indicates that the atmosphere of DENIS J081730.0−615520 is almost dust-free.
