= SDSS 1624+00 =

Brown dwarf in the constellation Ophiuchus

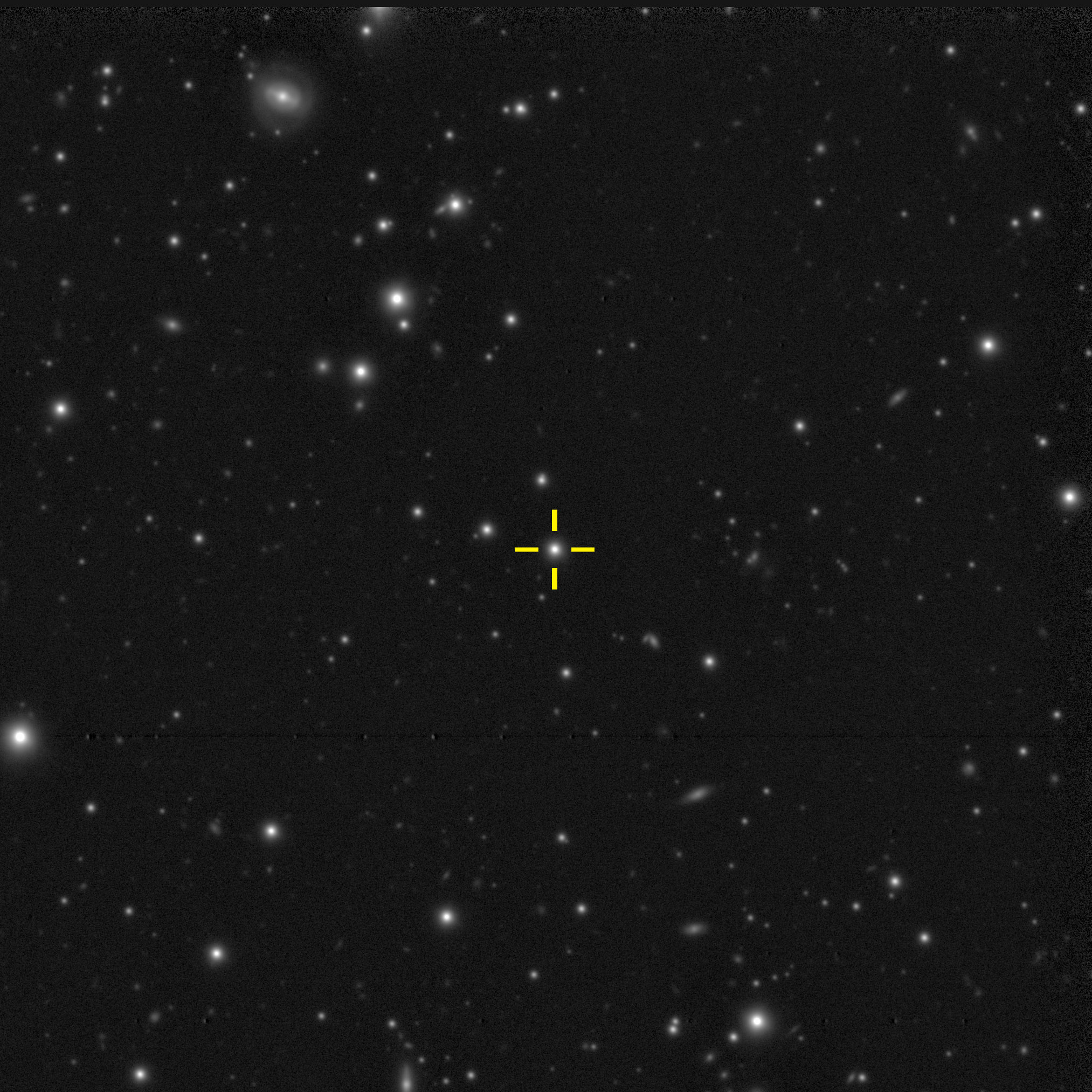
- VLT/HAWKI J-band image of SDSS 1624+00 (yellow crosshair)

Observation data Epoch J2000 Equinox J2000
- Constellation: Ophiuchus
- Right ascension: 16^{h} 24^{m} 14.37^{s}
- Declination: +00° 29′ 15.82″

Characteristics
- Evolutionary stage: brown dwarf
- Spectral type: T6
- Apparent magnitude (i): 22.70±0.27
- Apparent magnitude (z): 19.02±0.04

Astrometry
Radial velocity (R_{v})	−30.7±3.0 km/s
Proper motion (μ)	RA: −373±2 mas/yr Dec.: −9±2 mas/yr
Parallax (π)	90.9±1.2 mas
Distance	35.9 ± 0.5 ly (11.0 ± 0.1 pc)

Details
Mass	17+3 −2 M_{Jup}
Radius	0.73±0.01 R_{Jup}
Luminosity (bolometric)	10^{−5.228±0.013} L_{☉}
Surface gravity (log g)	4.89+0.08 −0.05 cgs
Temperature	1,037±7 K
Metallicity	$\begin{smallmatrix}\left[\ce{M}/\ce{H}\right]\end{smallmatrix}$ = −0.18+0.03 −0.02
Rotational velocity (v sin i)	38.5±2.0 km/s
Age	~1 Gyr

Other designations
- 2MASS J16241436+0029158, WISE J162414.09+002915.6, SDSS J162414.37+002915.6, CNS5 4015, TIC 5791302

Database references
SIMBAD	data

SDSS 1624+00 (also known as SDSSp J162414.371+002915.6) is the first T dwarf discovered in the field, meaning it does free-float in space and does not belong to a group of stars.

The object was discovered after Gliese 229B and at around the same time Gliese 570D was discovered. SDSS 1624+00 was discovered in 1999 with preliminary data of the Sloan Digital Sky Survey. It was selected because of its extreme red color (i-z=3.77±0.21 mag). Optical spectroscopy was obtained with the Apache Point 3.5 m telescope and near-infrared photometry and spectroscopy with the United Kingdom Infrared Telescope. The spectrum showed absorption due to water vapor, methane and caesium and the spectrum was similar to Gliese 229B, but with SDSS 1624+00 showing a stronger potassium line. It is 1.2 mag fainter than Gliese 229B, which helped to constrain the distance to around 10 parsec.

A red spectrum was obtained with the Keck Observatory. The researchers found that SDSS 1624+00 is likely warmer than Gliese 229B, due to stronger absorption by alkali metals (caesium, potassium and sodium). Later it was discovered that Gliese 229B is a binary, which can cause differences in the spectrum. SDSS 1624+00 was assigned a spectral type of T6 by two teams at the same time.

SDSS 1624+00 was one of the few T-dwarfs observed with JWST NIRSpec and MIRI spectroscopy, which revealed additional molecules in its atmosphere, namely carbon monoxide, carbon dioxide and ammonia.

== Potential variability ==
Additional near-infrared spectra were obtained with the Subaru Telescope. The multiple spectra taken over a period of 80 minutes showed possible variability in the water vapor absorption. Later observations did not find water vapor variability in spectra with the Very Large Telescope. Potential strong water vapor variability was also found with Hubble WFC3. Observations on Kitt Peak 2.1 m telescope also found low significance evidence for variability of this T-dwarf. Analysis of archived WFC3 data later found it not to be variable.
