= T dwarf =

Brown dwarf or exoplanet with atmospheric methane

An object with the spectral type T (also called T dwarf or methane brown dwarf) is either a brown dwarf or a young free-floating planetary-mass object. A directly imaged exoplanet with a young age can also be a T-dwarf. T dwarfs are colder than L dwarfs, but warmer than Y dwarfs.

== Prototype Gliese 229B ==
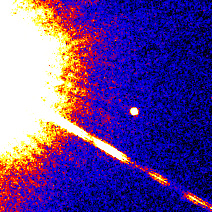
Hubble image of Gliese 229B

The first T-dwarf discovered was Gliese 229B, which was discovered in 1995. This object had a temperature below 1000 K and showed methane (CH_{4}), water vapor (H_{2}O) and carbon monoxide (CO) in its spectrum. In the upper atmosphere CO is converted into CH_{4} and H_{2}O, while the opposite is true for the hotter lower atmosphere. It also showed absorption due to caesium (Cs), but absorption features commonly found in M-dwarfs (CaH, FeH, TiO, and VO) were missing. Ammonia (NH_{3}) was included in the analysis of the spectrum. Sodium (Na) and potassium (K) are also detected in this T-dwarf. Later work found a dynamical mass of 70 ± 5 M_{J} for Gliese 229B, which is much higher than the cooling models would suggest. The spectral type is somewhat ambiguous. This is because it shows strong CH_{4} absorption at 1.3 and 1.6 μm, indicative of a T7 type, but weaker CH_{4} and H_{2}O features at 1.1, 1.4, 1.9, and 2.2 μm, indicative of a T5-T6 type. It is also suspected that Gliese 229B is a binary, which could explain its high mass and its unusual spectrum. The binarity was confirmed in 2024 with instruments on the Very Large Telescope, which resolved the pair and constrained their orbit to be a tight semi-major axis of about 16 Earth-Moon distances and an orbital period of about 12.1 days. Gliese 229Ba has a mass of about 38 M_{J} and Gliese 229Bb has a mass of about 34 M_{J}.

== Spectral type T ==
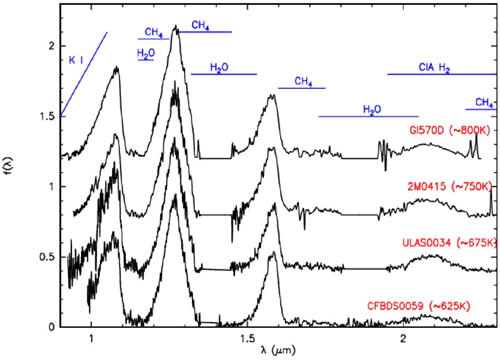
Spectra of mid to late T-dwarfs, showing absorption due to methane, water vapor, CIA hydrogen and potassium

Properties of typical T dwarfs
Spectral type	Radius (R_{☉})	Luminosity (L_{☉})	Effective temperature (K)
T0	0.098	2.2×10^{−5}	1,255
T1	0.100	2.0×10^{−5}	1,240
T2	0.100	1.9×10^{−5}	1,220
T3	0.102	1.7×10^{−5}	1,200
T4	0.101	1.4×10^{−5}	1,180
T5	0.101	1.1×10^{−5}	1,160
T6	0.100	7.6×10^{−6}	950
T7	0.098	4.3×10^{−6}	825
T8	0.095	1.9×10^{−6}	680
T9	0.100	7.1×10^{−7}	560

The spectral type "T" was first proposed in 1999 with Gliese 229B as its only representative at the time. Next came the discovery of the first field T dwarf SDSS 1624+00, four T dwarfs from the Two Micron All-Sky Survey, and the cold companion Gliese 570D,. These were primarily mid- to late T-dwarfs, with the first early T-dwarfs (SDSS 0837, SDSS 1254, and SDSS 1021) discovered in data of the Sloan Digital Sky Survey by Sandy Leggett et al. in 2000. These objects show weaker CH_{4} absorption than previously discovered T-dwarfs.

CH_{4} appears first in the K-band in L8 dwarfs, and L- and T-dwarfs are distinguished by the appearance of CH_{4} in the H-band for T-dwarfs. T-dwarfs show an increasing absorption of H_{2}O and CH_{4} from T0 to T8. Neutral sodium (Na I) and potassium (K I) features in the red optical broaden in L- and T-dwarfs, while narrower features at 1-1.2 micron strengthen then weaken across this sequence. Iron hydride (FeH) briefly emerges in the early T dwarfs and then fades toward the mid-types. The behavior of these features were synthesized into a unified near-infrared classification scheme in 2006.

One of the coldest T-dwarfs was discovered with UKIDSS, called UGPS 0722-05. Researchers used WISE to discover additional late T-dwarfs and the objects of the newly discovered Y-dwarfs. The transition between T- and Y-dwarfs is defined with the help of UGPS 0722-05 as the T9 standard and WISE 1738+2732 as the Y0 standard. Late T and early Y-dwarfs show deep H_{2}O and CH_{4} absorption features and the transition between T- and Y-dwarfs occurs near 500 K. Another important T-dwarf is Luhman 16B, which is the closest T-dwarf. It has a spectral type of T0.5, near the L/T transition. It shows a hint of FeH in the spectrum, which weakens in late L dwarfs, but strengthens in early to mid T-dwarfs due to cloud disruption. Observations of T-dwarfs in the near- and mid-infrared with JWST clearly show additional absorption features due to NH_{3}, CH_{4}, H_{2}O, CO and carbon dioxide (CO_{2}). Observations with Gemini showed the first detection of hydrogen sulfide (H_{2}S) and molecular hydrogen (H_{2}) in the T6 dwarf DENIS J081730.0−615520. The molecules hydrogen cyanide (HCN) and acetylene (C_{2}H_{2}) were found in the T-dwarf binary WISE 0458+6434 in 2025 with JWST. The molecules silane (SiH_{4}) and phosphine (PH_{3}) were reported in a pair of metal poor brown dwarfs in 2026.

=== Subdwarfs ===
Subdwarfs with a T spectral type are known, with 2MASSI J0937347+293142 being the first T-type subdwarf. It shows blue near-infrared colors due to suppression of the 2.1 μm peak, likely caused by enhanced collision induced absorption (CIA) of hydrogen (H_{2}). Subdwarfs have a low metallicity and at first only a small sample with moderate low metallicity was known, most notably a T dwarf companion to the nearby metal-poor M dwarf Wolf 1130. In 2020 the backyard worlds citizen science project discovered the first extreme subdwarfs of spectral type T, called WISEA 0414−5854 and WISEA 1810−1010. These objects have unusual blue colors, indicative of a lower absorption from CH_{4}. Follow-up observations of WISEA 1810−1010 by Nicolas Lodieu et al. showed that it only shows absorption due to H_{2}O and H_{2} in its optical and near-infrared spectrum. CH_{4} was found to be missing completely, in contrast to the definition of T-dwarfs as "methane dwarfs", and WISEA 1810−1010 was labeled a "water vapor dwarf". In 2024, Adam Burgasser et al. introduced a classification system for T subdwarfs, which allows the classification into mild subdwarfs (d/sdT), subdwarfs (sdT) and extreme subdwarfs (esdT). The signature of a low metallicity are a strong collision induced absorption (CIA) of hydrogen molecules, obscured methane and water features, and weak potassium K I absorption. This work also identified three brown dwarfs that are candidate members of stellar streams. Future works with JWST, Euclid, Rubin and Roman will increase the sample of T subdwarfs to many thousands. JWST has already discovered the first distant T subdwarfs such as Nonino's Dwarf and UNCOVER-BD-1

== Brown dwarfs ==
Most T-dwarfs are brown dwarfs. Brown dwarfs have a mass lower than the hydrogen burning minimum mass (0.075 M_{☉} or 78.5 M_{J}). There are currently 920 objects in the UltracoolSheet with an infrared spectral type of T. The table of ultracool fundamental parameters lists objects with an infrared spectral type of T that have masses between 2 and 58 M_{J}. Additional T-type brown dwarfs that orbit stars or white dwarfs are known and the age of the primary can help to determine the mass of the T-dwarfs. One of the oldest known T-dwarfs is Wolf 1130C, which is around 10 billion years old.

== Planetary-mass objects and exoplanets ==
One of the first objects that was conclusively determined to be a young isolated planetary-mass object with spectral type T was SDSS J1110+0116 (T5.5), which is a member of the 120 Myr old AB Doradus moving group. Another significant discovery is one of the closest planetary-mass objects, called SIMP J013656.5+093347 (T2.5, 12.7 ±1.0 M_{J}), which is part of the 200 Myr old Carina-Near moving group. This object is also variable with a period of 2.4 hours, likely due to clouds. It also shows radio emission due to aurorae. Additional young T-dwarf candidates are known from other young stellar associations and these objects show red colors compared to field T-dwarfs. Young directly imaged exoplanets and planetary-mass companions sometimes show a T spectral type, such as 51 Eridani b (T4.5-T6).

== Clouds and variability ==
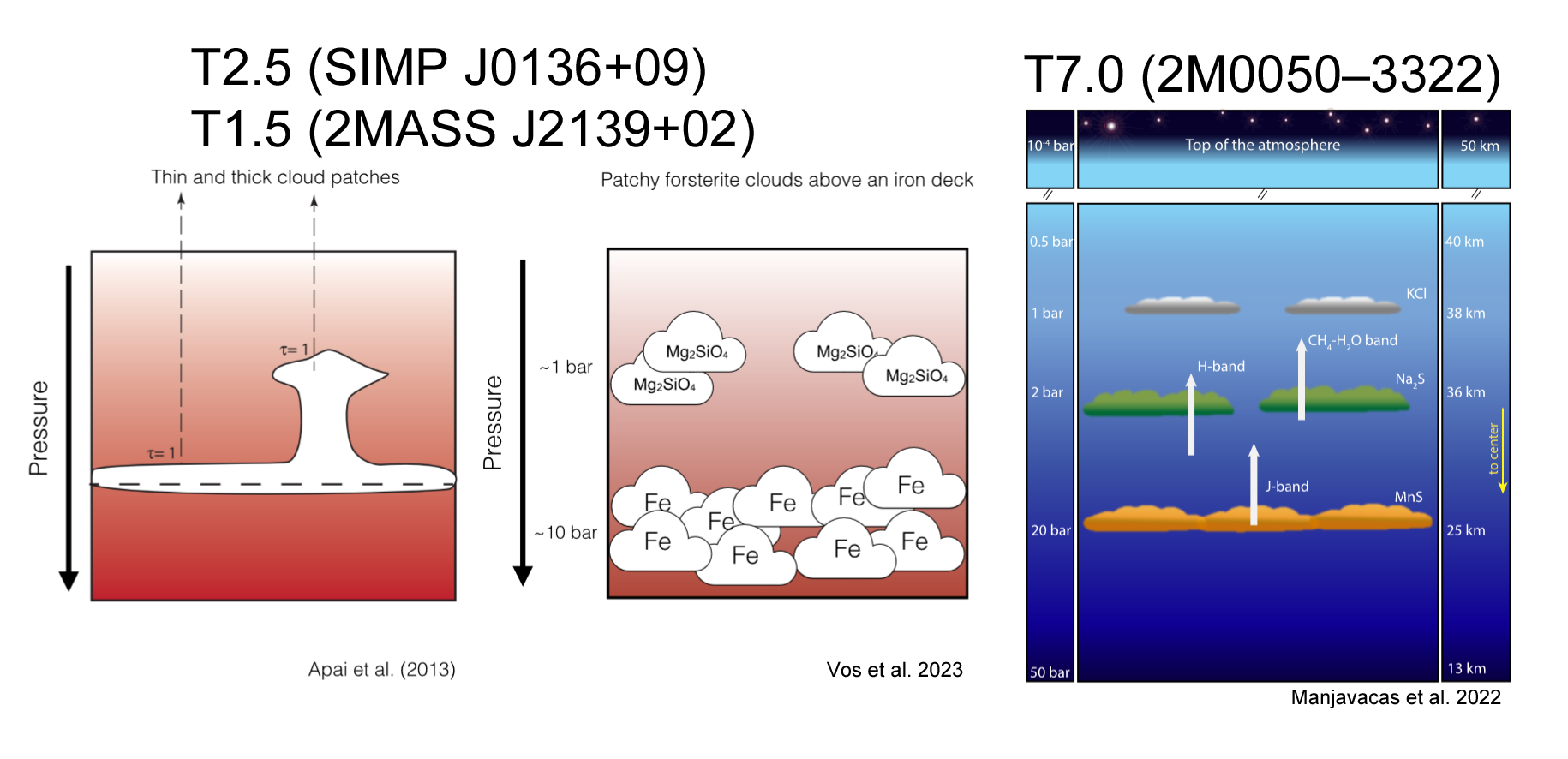
Cloud models in early (SIMP J0136+09, 2MASS J2139+02) and a late-type T-dwarf (2MASS J0050–3322)

Two of the most variable brown dwarfs are the T-dwarfs Luhman 16B, showing a variation up to 20% and 2MASS J2139+02, which varies with an amplitude as high as 26%. T-dwarfs, especially young early-type T-dwarfs are often variable. The variability has been connected to the presence of clouds, but other explanations were proposed, such as hot spots and aurorae. These early T-dwarfs are thought to have an iron cloud deck and a patchy silicate cloud layer on top of it. The silicate clouds are thought to dissipate near the L/T transition, resulting into the patchy silicate cloud layer and high amplitude variability for late L and early T dwarfs. The disruption of clouds make deeper layers accessible for observations. These deeper layers are warmer and contain FeH. This explains the reappearance and strengthening of FeH and the blue near-infrared color for early to mid T-dwarfs. Late T-dwarfs should also have cloud layers made of chromium, potassium chloride and different sulfides. These cloud layers are thin and exist above the silicate clouds. A few late T-dwarfs are known to be variable, such as Ross 458C (T8), WISE 0458+6434 (T8.5), and 2MASS J09393548-2448279 (T8).

Subtype	Approx. Temperature (K)	Key Spectral Features (Note: Spectral features are not clouds, but mostly exist in the atmosphere as a gas at certain pressures. See figure 15 of Manjavacas et al.) and clouds	Notes
T0–T1	~1300–1200	Weak methane (CH_{4}) in H-band; water vapor (H_{2}O) begins to appear	Transition from L dwarfs; cloud disruption begins
T2–T3	~1200–1100	Stronger CH_{4} and H_{2}O absorption; FeH may reappear Patchy silicate clouds; variable brightness	
T4–T5	~1100–1000	Deep CH_{4} bands in H and K bands; Na and K broaden Often used as benchmarks for mid-T dwarfs	
T6–T7	~1000–800	Very strong CH_{4} and H_{2}O; NH_{3} begins to appear Cooler atmospheres; less cloud cover	
T8–T9	~800–500	Deep CH_{4}, H_{2}O, NH_{3}; CO_{2} and H_{2}S may appear Transition to Y dwarfs; very faint in infrared	

== Magnetic field and aurorae ==
The first T-dwarf detected in radio emission was 2MASS J1047+21 (T6.5), which was discovered with the Arecibo radio telescope. Since then several other T-dwarfs with radio emission were discovered, including the planetary-mass object SIMP J013656.5+093347 (T2.5) and the discovery of the T-dwarf BDR J1750+3809 with the help of radio emission. The coldest T-dwarf with a radio emission is WISEPA J062309.94-045624.6 (T8). Radio emission in T-dwarfs is thought to be generated by an aurora, similar to late L-dwarfs. Additionally H-alpha emission is often connected to radio emission in L4-T8 dwarfs and is thought to come from aurorae. 2MASS 1237+6526 (T6.5) is an unusual strong H-alpha emitting T-dwarf that was discovered in 2000. It was theorized that the H-alpha emission, UV emission and radio emission come either from a cold companion (1-2.8 R_{🜨}; <500 K) or from an aurora.

== Binaries ==
Late T dwarf binaries are less common than L-type binaries. Only 8±6% systems with a T5–Y0 primary are binaries and these systems usually have a separation of a few astronomical units (AU). One well-known T dwarf binary is Epsilon Indi B. This binary consists of a T1 and a T6 dwarf that orbit each other with a separation of 2.65 AU. T dwarf triple systems also exist, with 2M0838+15 being the first fully resolved triple T dwarf that was discovered.

== See also ==
- List of brown dwarfs
