= Gliese 570 =

Quaternary star system in the constellation Libra

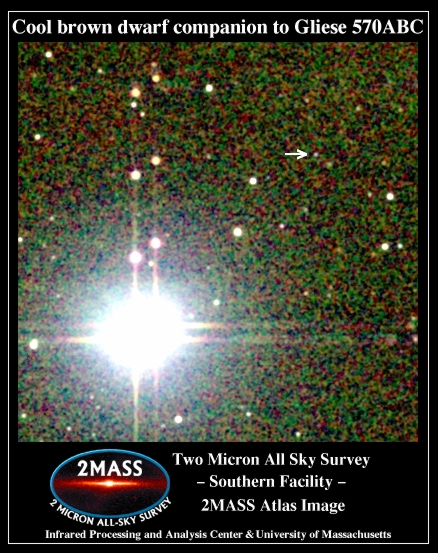
- The quaternary star system Gliese 570. The T-type methane brown dwarf Gliese 570D is indicated with an arrow. Credit: 2MASS

Observation data Epoch J2000.0 Equinox ICRS
- Constellation: Libra
- Right ascension: 14^{h} 57^{m} 28.00144^{s}
- Declination: −21° 24′ 55.7131″
- Apparent magnitude (V): 5.75 / 8.07 / 10.5

Characteristics
- Spectral type: K4V / M1V / M3V / T7V
- U−B color index: 1.06 /1.22
- B−V color index: 1.11 / 1.51
- Variable type: None / BY Dra

Astrometry

A
Radial velocity (R_{v})	+26.75±0.12 km/s
Proper motion (μ)	RA: +1031.472 mas/yr Dec.: −1723.619 mas/yr
Parallax (π)	169.8843±0.0653 mas
Distance	19.199 ± 0.007 ly (5.886 ± 0.002 pc)
Absolute magnitude (M_{V})	6.89

BC
Radial velocity (R_{v})	+25.9 km/s
Proper motion (μ)	RA: +961.78 mas/yr Dec.: −1677.83 mas/yr
Parallax (π)	169.1±0.9 mas
Distance	19.3 ± 0.1 ly (5.91 ± 0.03 pc)
Absolute magnitude (M_{V})	9.19 / 11.05

D
Proper motion (μ)	RA: +1038.08 mas/yr Dec.: −1677.59 mas/yr
Parallax (π)	169.30±1.70 mas
Distance	19.3 ± 0.2 ly (5.91 ± 0.06 pc)

Orbit
Primary	A
Secondary	BC
Period (P)	2130 years
Semi-major axis (a)	32.4" (190.7 AU (Note: Semi-major axis in AU = $\frac{semimajor\ axis\ in\ seconds}{parallax}\ {{=}}\ \frac{32.4}{0.1698843}$ = 190.7 AU; as the eccentricity is 0.2, the distance fluctuates between 80% and 120% of that, roughly from 153 AU to 229 AU.))
Eccentricity (e)	0.2
Inclination (i)	72.53°

Orbit
Primary	B
Secondary	C
Period (P)	308.86±0.01 days
Semi-major axis (a)	0.1481±0.0005" (0.8758 AU (Note: Semi-major axis in AU = $\frac{semimajor\ axis\ in\ seconds}{parallax}\ {{=}}\ \frac{0.1481}{0.1691}$ = 0.8758 AU; as the eccentricity is 0.758, the distance fluctuates between 24% and 176% of that, roughly from 0.212 AU to 1.54 AU.))
Eccentricity (e)	0.758±0.001
Inclination (i)	106.1±0.1°
Longitude of the node (Ω)	16.9±0.2°
Periastron epoch (T)	50270.86±0.04
Argument of periastron (ω) (secondary)	308.3±0.2°
Semi-amplitude (K_{1}) (primary)	18.23±0.06 km/s
Semi-amplitude (K_{2}) (secondary)	27.2±0.1 km/s

Details

A
Mass	0.679±0.021 M_{☉}
Radius	0.715±0.009 R_{☉}
Luminosity (bolometric)	0.19±0.01 L_{☉}
Temperature	4629±123 K
Metallicity [Fe/H]	−0.04±0.07 dex
Rotational velocity (v sin i)	1.50 km/s
Age	8.9±2.5 Gyr

B
Mass	0.562±0.006 M_{☉}
Radius	0.615 ± 0.039 (Note: Calculated, using the Stefan-Boltzmann law and the star's effective temperature and luminosity, with respect to the solar nominal effective temperature of 5772 K: $$\sqrt{\biggl(\frac{5772}{3530}\biggr)^4 \cdot 10^{-1.276}} = 0.615\ R_\odot.$$) R_{☉}
Luminosity	0.053±0.006 L_{☉}
Temperature	3530+46 −45 K

C
Mass	0.377±0.003 M_{☉}
Radius	0.399 ± 0.028 (Note: Calculated, using the Stefan-Boltzmann law and the star's effective temperature and luminosity, with respect to the solar nominal effective temperature of 5772 K: $$\sqrt{\biggl(\frac{5772}{3304}\biggr)^4 \cdot 10^{-1.768}} = 0.399\ R_\odot.$$) R_{☉}
Luminosity	0.0171+0.0021 −0.0019 L_{☉}
Temperature	3304+64 −63 K

D
Mass	34.6+7.5 −6.5 M_{Jup}
Radius	0.89+0.05 −0.04 R_{Jup}
Luminosity	2.88+0.21 −0.19×10^{−7} L_{☉}
Surface gravity (log g)	5.04±0.13 cgs
Temperature	786±20 K

Other designations
- 33 G. Librae, GJ 570, ADS 9446, WDS J14575-2125
- A: KX Lib, BD−20°4125, FK5 1391, HD 131977, HIP 73184, HR 5568, SAO 183040, LAL 27173, LFT 1161, LHS 387, LPM 551, LTT 5949, PLX 3375, MCC 726
- BC: BD−20°4123, HD 131976, HIP 73182, SAO 183039, LFT 1160, LHS 386, LPM 550, LTT 5948
- D: 2MASS J14571496-2121477

Database references
SIMBAD	A
- BC
- D
Exoplanet Archive	data
ARICNS	data
- Location of Gliese 570 (circled)

Gliese 570 (or 33 G. Librae) is a quaternary star system approximately 19 light-years away. The primary star is an orange dwarf star (much dimmer and smaller than the Sun). The other secondary stars are themselves a binary system, two red dwarfs that orbit the primary star. A brown dwarf has been confirmed to be orbiting in the system.

== Distance and visibility ==
In the night sky, the Gliese 570 system lies in the southwestern part of Libra. The system is southwest of Alpha Librae and northwest of Sigma Librae. In the early 1990s, the European Hipparcos mission measured the parallax of components B and C, suggesting that the system was at a distance of 24.4 light-years from the Sun. This, however, was a relatively large error as Earth-based parallax and orbit observations suggest that the two stars are actually part of a system with Gliese 570 A, and must actually lie at the same distance.

== Star system ==
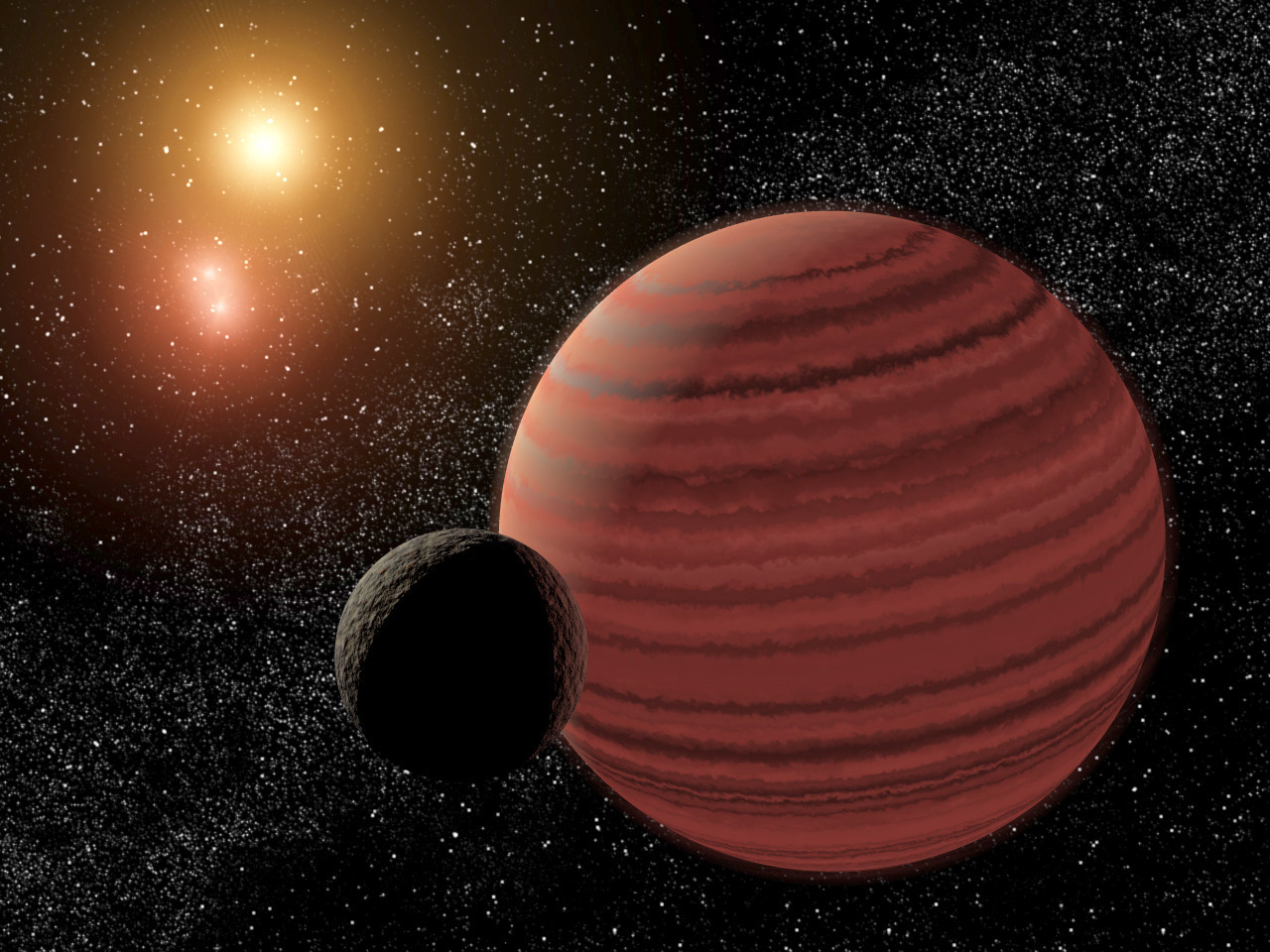
An artist's impression of Gliese 570 D (with imagined satellite) showing the primary stars

The primary star of the system (component A) is an orange dwarf star that may just have over three fourths the mass of the Sun, about 77 percent of its radius, and only 15.6 percent of its visual luminosity. It has a separation of 190 astronomical units from the binary components B and C, moving in an eccentric orbit that takes at least 2130 years to complete. Gliese 570 A is spectral type K4V and emits X-rays. Radial velocities of the primary obtained in the course of an extrasolar planet search at Lick Observatory show a linear trend probably due to the orbital motion of the Gliese 570 BC system around the primary.

A binary system in their own right, components B and C are both rather dim red dwarf stars that have less mass, radius, and luminosity than the Sun. Component B is spectral type M1V, component C is spectral type M3V, and both emit X-rays.

On January 15, 2000, Adam Burgasser et al. announced that they had found one of the coolest brown dwarfs then known. Catalogued as Gliese 570 D, it was observed at a wide separation of more than 1,500 astronomical unit from the triple star system. It has an estimated mass of 50 times that of Jupiter.

The status of Gliese 570 D as a brown dwarf was confirmed by infrared spectroscopy at the Cerro Tololo Interamerican Observatory in Chile. The surface temperature of this substellar object was found to be a relatively cool 500 degrees Celsius, making it cooler and less luminous than any other then-known brown dwarf (including the prototype "T" dwarf), and classifying the object as a T7-8V brown dwarf. No X-rays have been reported from this brown dwarf.

== Search for planets ==
In 1998, an extrasolar planet was announced to orbit the primary star within the Gliese 570 system. The planet, identified as "Gliese 570 Ab", was considered doubtful and the claim was retracted in 2000. No extrasolar planets have been confirmed to exist in this multiple star system thus far.

== See also ==
- Epsilon Indi
- Gliese 229
- HD 188753
- Iota Horologii
- Phi^{2} Pavonis
- List of nearest K-type stars
