= UNCOVER-BD-1 =

Distant brown dwarf

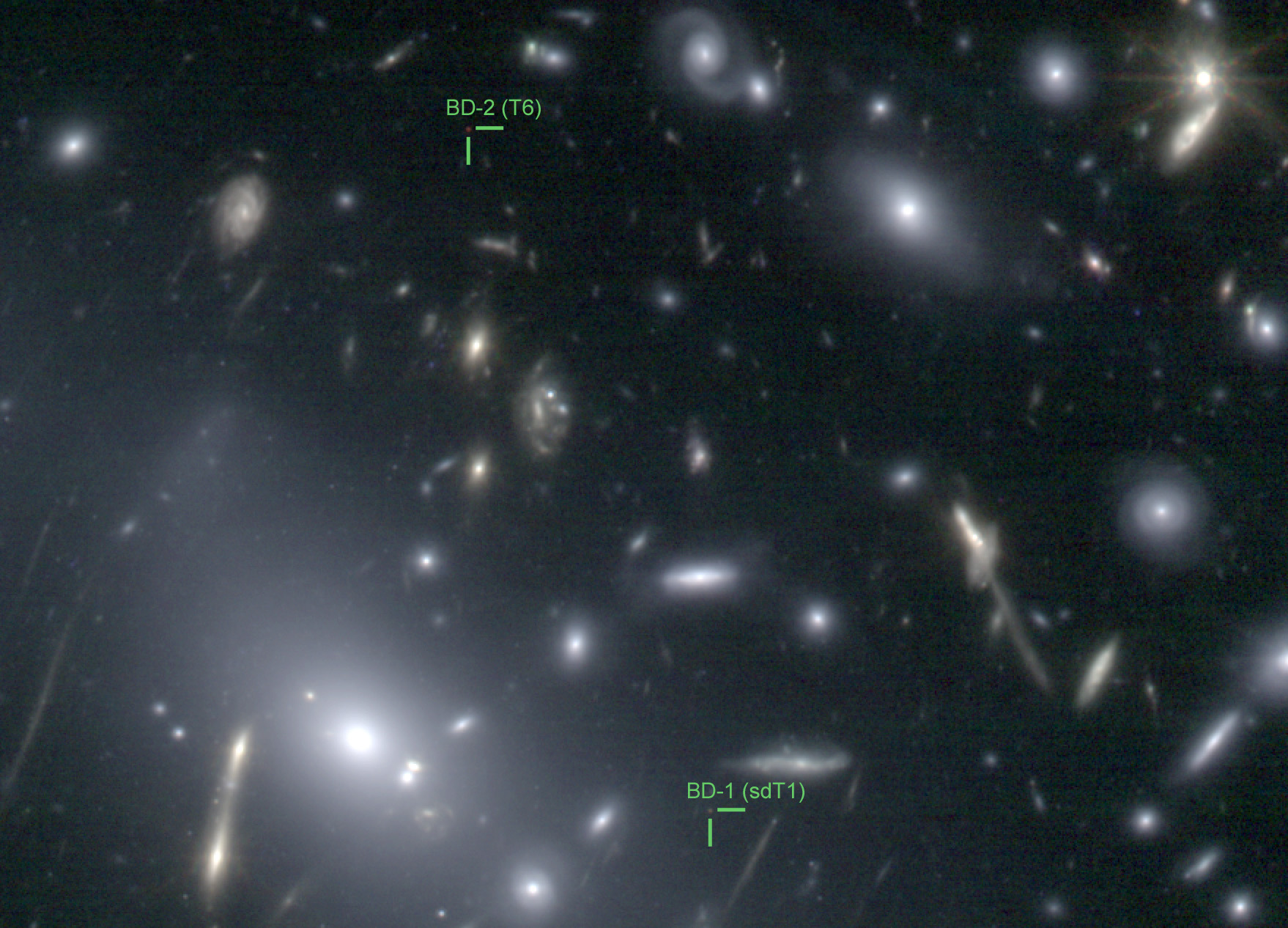
- UNCOVER-BD-1 (labelled BD-1 at the bottom) and UNCOVER-BD-2 (labelled BD-2 at the top) with the James Webb Space Telescope

Observation data Epoch J2000 Equinox J2000
- Constellation: Sculptor
- Right ascension: 00^{h} 14^{m} 09.00723075^{s}
- Declination: −30° 22′ 12.6039275″

Characteristics
- Evolutionary stage: brown dwarf
- Spectral type: T2.5 ± 1 or sdT1

Astrometry
Distance	aprx. 14700 ly or aprx. 15700 ly (4500 ± 1200 pc 4764+568 −130 pc)

Details
Mass	4.9+0.3 −0.2 M_{Jup}
Radius	1.52±0.02 R_{Jup}
Luminosity (bolometric)	10^{−4.236+0.028 −0.020} L_{☉}
Surface gravity (log g)	3.75 ± 0.25 or 5.0 cgs
Temperature	1300 ± 50 K
Metallicity	−1.0
Age	6.741+0.070 −0.055 Gyr

Other designations
- A2744-BD1, [BBL2024] UNCOVER-BD-1, MSA ID 32265, J00140901-3022126

Database references
SIMBAD	data

UNCOVER-BD-1 (also known as Abell2744-BD1, A2744-BD1) is a distant brown dwarf. It is the most distant T dwarf discovered to date (about 4.5 or 4.8 kpc).

UNCOVER-BD-1 was discovered in a deep James Webb Space Telescope field called UNCOVER, which targets the galaxy cluster Abell 2744 and is primarily used to study galaxies. As the name says, the UNCOVER team used NIRCam to take images and NIRSpec multiobject prism spectroscopy to take spectra of any object detected in the field. The object was independently discovered by two teams. Both teams also discovered two other distant T-dwarfs.

Langeroodi & Hjorth concluded from its position and distance that UNCOVER-BD-1 likely is located outside the thin disk of the Milky Way. Burgasser et al. found a high probability (76%) of it being a thick disk member, and a moderate probability (24%) of it being a halo member. This team also found that it is likely a subdwarf and comparison with the extreme subdwarf WISEA 1810−1010 produced a better fit to the widened 1.1 μm absorption feature. This could also mean that UNCOVER-BD-1 is colder and closer than currently estimated. The spectrum in their work has several absorption features from molecules labelled. Those are methane (CH_{4}), water vapor (H_{2}O), carbon monoxide (CO) and collision induced absorption by hydrogen molecules (H_{2}). Langeroodi & Hjorth find a low mass of around 5 M_{J}, but they also do not consider it as a subdwarf, which might influence the estimates of physical properties.
