= Gliese 832 b =

Extrasolar planet in the constellation Grus

Discovery
- Discovered by: Bailey et al.
- Discovery site: Anglo-Australian Observatory
- Discovery date: September 1, 2008
- Detection method: Doppler spectroscopy

Orbital characteristics
- Semi-major axis: 3.7±0.1 AU
- Eccentricity: 0.05±0.03
- Orbital period (sidereal): 3853+51 −47 d 10.55+0.14 −0.13 yr
- Inclination: 51°±3° or 134°±3°
- Longitude of ascending node: 61°+17° −13° or 265°+12° −15°
- Time of periastron: 2456696+454 −338 JD
- Argument of periastron: 207°+22° −31°
- Star: Gliese 832

Physical characteristics
- Mass: 0.99+0.09 −0.08 M_{J}

Gliese 832 b (Gl 832 b or GJ 832 b) is a gas giant exoplanet about the mass of Jupiter, located 16.2 light-years from the Sun in the constellation of Grus, orbiting the red dwarf star Gliese 832.

== Orbit ==
The planet takes 10.5 years to revolve around its star at an orbital distance of 3.7 AU; at the time of discovery, this was the longest-period Jupiter-like planet known orbiting a red dwarf. The brightness of the faint parent star at that distance corresponds to the brightness of the Sun from 80 AU (or 100 times brighter than a full Moon as seen from Earth).

== Discovery ==
The planet was discovered at the Anglo-Australian Observatory on September 1, 2008. It would induce an astrometric perturbation on its star of at least 0.95 milliarcseconds and is thus a good candidate for being detected by astrometric observations. Despite its relatively large angular distance, direct imaging is problematic due to the star–planet contrast. Gliese 832 b was confirmed and its orbital solution refined by subsequent studies in 2011, 2014, and 2022. The planet was detected astrometrically by two different 2023 studies, determining its inclination and revealing a true mass close to the mass of Jupiter.

== See also ==
- Epsilon Eridani b
- Epsilon Indi Ab
