= Wolf 1130 =

Triple star system in the constellation Cygnus

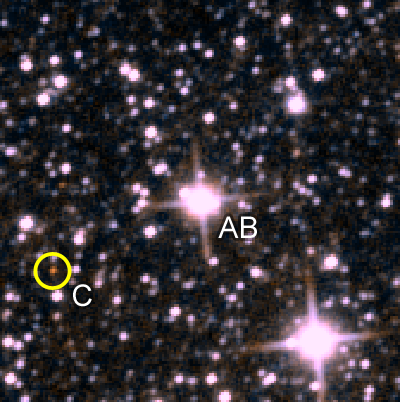
- unWISE image of the triple Wolf 1130 AB (center) and C (lower left in the yellow circle)

Observation data Epoch J2000.0 Equinox ICRS
- Constellation: Cygnus
- Wolf 1130 AB
- Right ascension: 20^{h} 05^{m} 02.1951^{s}
- Declination: +54° 26′ 03.234″
- Apparent magnitude (V): 13.883±0.007
- Wolf 1130 C
- Right ascension: 20^{h} 05^{m} 20.7785^{s}
- Declination: +54° 24′ 43.274″

Characteristics

Wolf 1130 AB
- Evolutionary stage: subdwarf + white dwarf
- Spectral type: M3+WD
- Variable type: Flare star

Wolf 1130 C
- Evolutionary stage: brown dwarf
- Spectral type: (e)sdT6:

Astrometry

Wolf 1130AB
Proper motion (μ)	RA: −1,159.524 mas/yr Dec.: −904.008 mas/yr
Parallax (π)	60.2958±0.0266 mas
Distance	54.09 ± 0.02 ly (16.585 ± 0.007 pc)
Absolute magnitude (M_{V})	10.99

Wolf 1130C
Proper motion (μ)	RA: −1,156.2 mas/yr Dec.: −904.4 mas/yr
Parallax (π)	53.9±2.7 mas
Distance	61 ± 3 ly (18.6 ± 0.9 pc)

Orbit
Primary	Wolf 1130A
Secondary	Wolf 1130B
Period (P)	0.497±0.003 d
Semi-major axis (a)	ca. 3 R_{☉}
Eccentricity (e)	0.011±0.003
Inclination (i)	29±3°
Longitude of the node (Ω)	210±19°

Details

A
Mass	0.26 M_{☉}
Radius	0.33 R_{☉}
Surface gravity (log g)	4.9 cgs
Temperature	3,530±60 K
Metallicity [Fe/H]	−0.70±0.12 dex

B
Mass	1.24+0.19 −0.15 M_{☉}
Radius	0.005 R_{☉}
Temperature	<7,000 K

C
Mass	44+6 −5 M_{Jup}
Radius	0.80±0.02 R_{Jup}
Luminosity (bolometric)	10^{−6.047±0.003} L_{☉}
Surface gravity (log g)	5.19+0.05 −0.06 cgs
Temperature	621±9 K
Metallicity	−0.68±0.04 dex

Other designations
- HIP 98906, WDS J20050+5426, 2MASS J20050227+5426037, GJ 781, LHS 482, WISEA J200500.79+542553.7, WISE J200520.38+542433.9

Database references
SIMBAD	Wolf 1130AB
- Wolf 1130C

Wolf 1130 is a nearby pre-cataclysmic triple-star system consisting of a cold subdwarf of spectral type sdM3 (A), an ultramassive white dwarf (B) and a cold brown dwarf of spectral type sdT8 (C). Wolf 1130 is 54.1 light-years (16.6 parsecs) distant from earth.

The system is older than 10 billion years based on UVW velocities and the low metallicity of Wolf 1130A. This makes Wolf 1130C one of the oldest brown dwarfs known to science, together with LSPM J0055+5948B, which has a similar age. There might be older brown dwarfs, such as WISE 1534−1043, which have less well-determined ages.

== The central binary ==
Wolf 1130A is a subdwarf of spectral type sdM3 with a mass of about 0.26 M_{☉} and a radius of 0.33 R_{☉}. Wolf 1130A and B are tidally locked, deforming Wolf 1130A into an ellipsoid shape. The radius of Wolf 1130A is inflated up to 20% due to rapid rotation in the tidally locked system. Wolf 1130A has a low metallicity of about [Fe/H]=−0.7 dex.

Wolf 1130B is an ultramassive white dwarf with a mass of about 1.24 M_{☉} and it remains invisible to telescopic observations. The progenitor of the white dwarf had a mass of about 6 to 8 M_{☉}. This progenitor probably spent between 50 and 100 million years in the main sequence before it became a giant star and engulfed Wolf 1130A in a common envelope. Because of its high mass, the white dwarf Wolf 1130B is suspected to consist of oxygen, magnesium and neon (an ONe white dwarf).

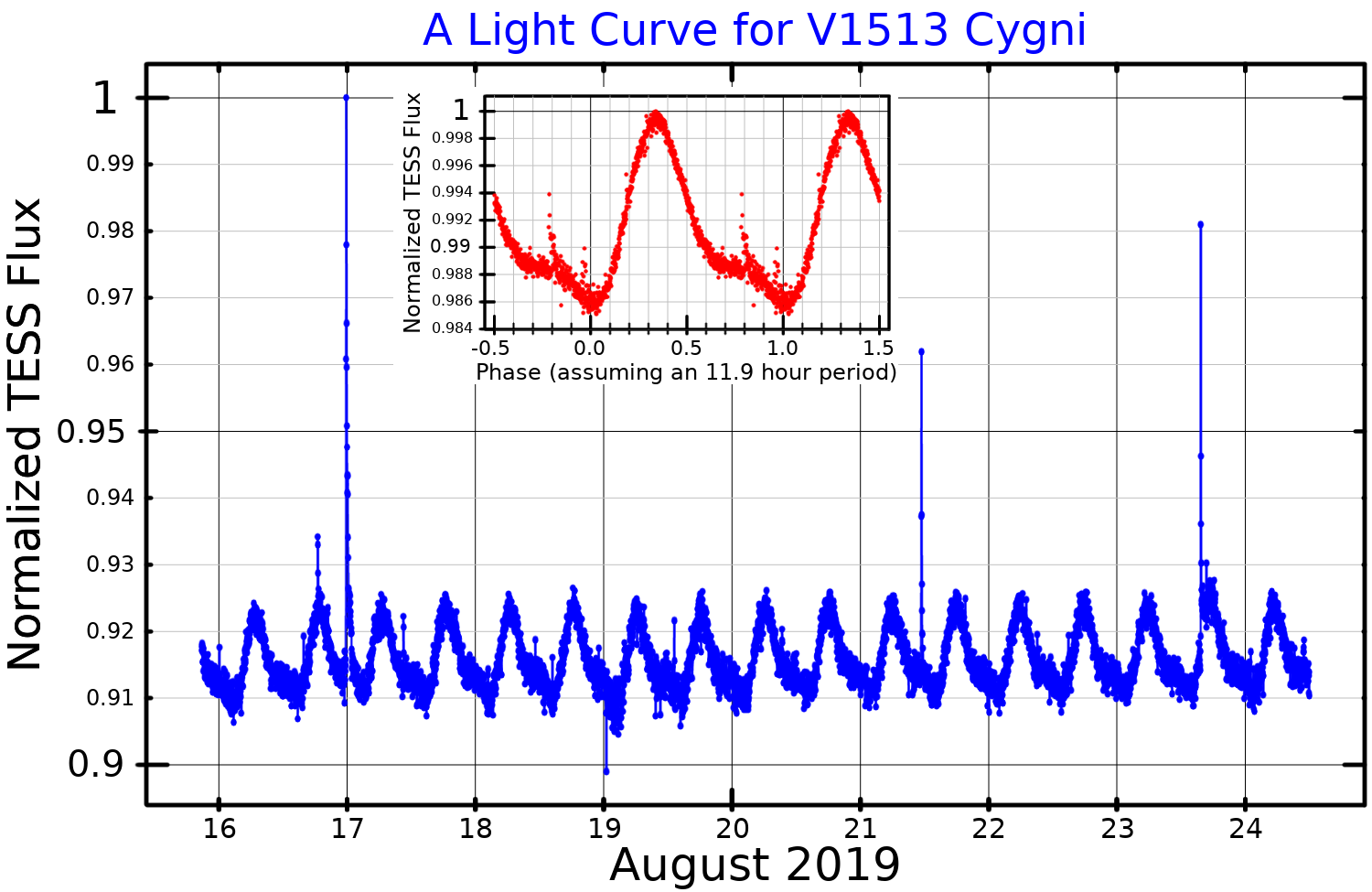
A light curve for V1513 Cygni, plotted from TESS data The main plot shows the normalized flux as a function of time, and the inset plot shows the data folded with a period of 11.9 hours.

Wolf 1130AB is a periodic variable star with a period of 0.497 days and also a flare star, with the variable-star designation V1513 Cygni. The flares occur due to material being occasionally accreted onto the surface of the white dwarf. Three components cause the variability of Wolf 1130A:

- ellipsoidal variability
- Doppler beaming
- thermal photometric variability

In the future the system will lose orbital energy due to effects such as magnetic braking and by emitting gravitational waves. Wolf 1130A will get close to the Roche radius of Wolf 1130B in about 6.2 billion years. At this point the system will transfer mass from the M-type subdwarf to the surface of the white dwarf, becoming a cataclysmic variable. Once the mass transfer starts, magnetic braking will gain strength, and after less than 500 million years the Wolf 1130AB pair will merge, possibly producing a type Ia supernova. Wolf 1130 is, as of 2018, the nearest candidate for a supernova explosion.

== The outer companion ==
The outer companion Wolf 1130C (WISE J200520.38+542433.9) was discovered in 2013. It has a temperature of 647 K (374 °C; 705 °F), a radius of 0.82 R_{J} and a mass of 44.9 M_{J}. The brown dwarf has a low metallicity which causes an unusually low luminosity compared to other stars of the same mass, and it is therefore classified as a subdwarf. It is suspected that it orbited Wolf 1130AB in a closer orbit when Wolf 1130B was still a main-sequence star. When Wolf 1130AB became a common-envelope binary and Wolf 1130B later a white dwarf, the entire system lost 80% of its mass and forced Wolf 1130C into a more distant orbit of 3,150 astronomical units. New classification of T-type subdwarfs found a metallicity of [M/H]=−0.65+0.10
−0.07 dex, using SAND models. This is consistent with the metallicity of the host star. The researchers classify this object as an (e)sdT6:, meaning it is between normal subdwarfs and extreme subdwarfs and the colon indicates an uncertain spectral classification. At the 245th meeting of the AAS it was announced that researchers detected phosphine in the atmosphere of this brown dwarf, which was detected in a James Webb Space Telescope spectrum. The researchers find a phosphine abundance of 0.100 ± 0.009 parts per million. This is the expected abundance for models that reproduce phosphine abundance in Jupiter and Saturn. But the abundance of phosphine in Wolf 1130C is much higher than in other brown dwarfs or exoplanets. The reason might be the low abundance of elements heavier than helium. Another possible explanation are novae from the primary Wolf 1130AB. These outbursts could have produced phosphorus and polluted the atmosphere of the brown dwarf. Additionally the researchers find that the absorption of CO_{2} was only marginally detected. This molecule is commonly found in other cold brown dwarfs.
