= Epsilon Indi Ab =

Gas giant orbiting Epsilon Indi A

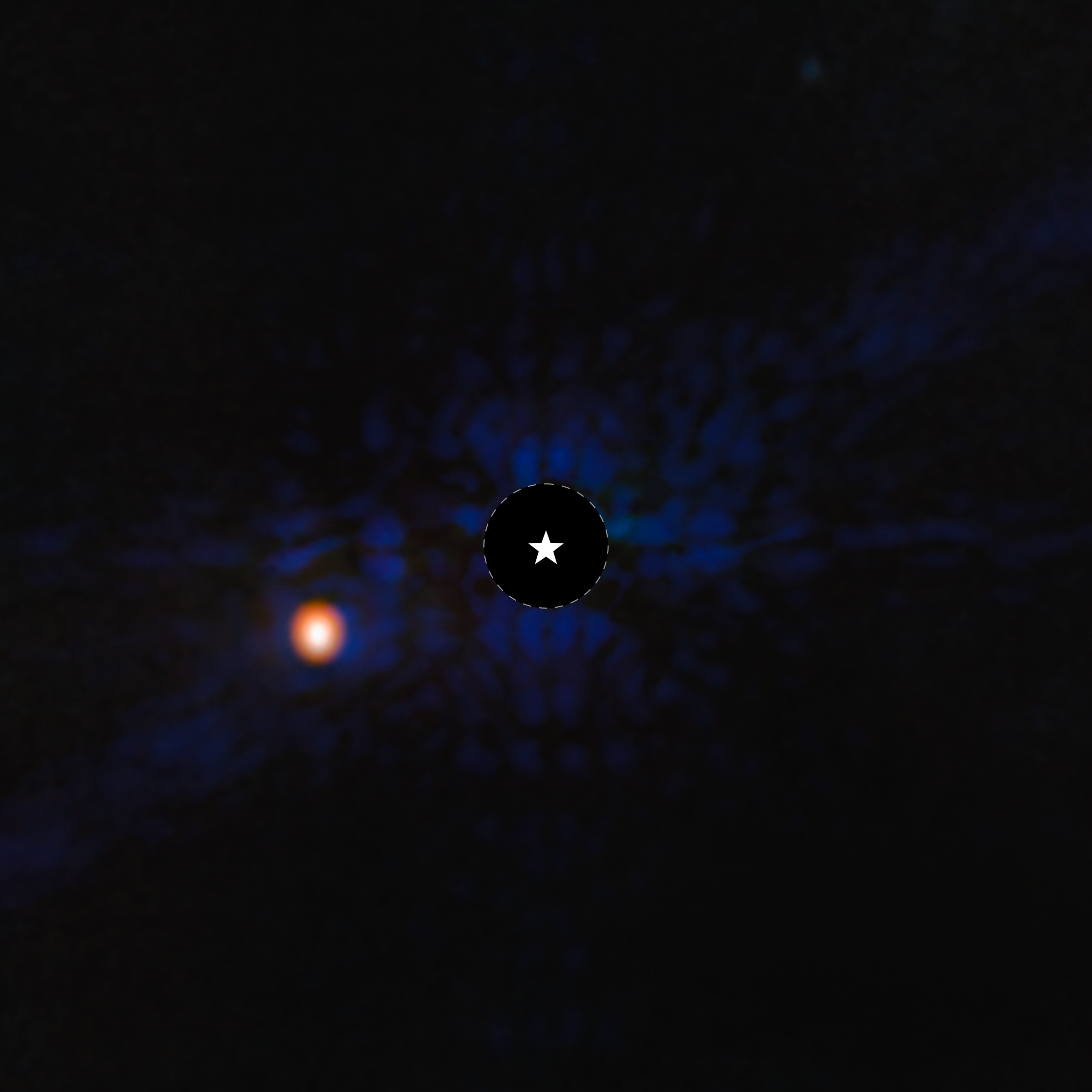
- Epsilon Indi Ab imaged by the James Webb Space Telescope MIRI. The star motif marks the position of its host star; whose light is blocked by a coronagraph.

Discovery
- Discovered by: Fabo Feng, et al.
- Discovery date: 21 March 2018 (suspected since 2002)
- Detection method: Radial velocity

Orbital characteristics
- Semi-major axis: 15.76+1.73 −1.39 AU; 20.9+5.8 −3.3 AU
- Eccentricity: 0.25±0.09
- Orbital period (sidereal): 70+12 −9 years 108+49 −25 years
- Inclination: 102.2°±1.7°
- Longitude of ascending node: 224°±2° 44.6±1.3
- Argument of periastron: −28°+15° −17° 62+48 −27
- Star: Epsilon Indi A

Physical characteristics
- Mean radius: 1.038+0.012 −0.009 R_{J}
- Mass: 6.50+0.72 −0.59 M_{J} 7.6±0.7 M_{J}
- Surface gravity: log g = 4.17±0.05 cgs
- Temperature: 275 ± 5 K (1.85 ± 5.00 °C; 35.33 ± 9.00 °F)

Epsilon Indi Ab is a gas giant exoplanet orbiting the star Epsilon Indi A, about 11.9 light-years away in the constellation of Indus. The planet was confirmed to exist in 2018. It orbits at around 30 AU (almost as far as Neptune from the Sun) with a period of around 180 years and a relatively high eccentricity of 0.4, and has a mass around seven times that of Jupiter. It was directly imaged using the James Webb Space Telescope in 2023 and the image was released on 24 July 2024.

As of 2024, Epsilon Indi Ab is the nearest exoplanet to be directly imaged, and with a temperature of about 275 K (2 °C; 35 °F), is also the coolest exoplanet to be directly imaged.

The Epsilon Indi system also contains a pair of brown dwarfs, Epsilon Indi Ba and Bb, at a wide separation from the primary star. As such, this system provides a benchmark case for the study of the formation of gas giants and brown dwarfs.

== History of observations ==
The first evidence of Epsilon Indi Ab was found in 2002 when measurements of the radial velocity of Epsilon Indi by Endl et al. appeared to show a trend that indicated a planetary companion with an orbital period of more than 20 years. A substellar object with a minimum mass of 1.6 M_{J} and orbital separation of roughly 6.5 AU was within the parameters of the highly approximate data.

A visual search using the ESO's Very Large Telescope found one potential candidate. However, a subsequent examination by the Hubble Space Telescope NICMOS showed that this was a background object. As of 2009, a search for an unseen companion at 4 μm failed to detect an orbiting object. These observations further constrained the hypothetical object to be 5–20 times the mass of Jupiter, orbiting between 10 and 20 AU and have an inclination of more than 20°. Alternatively, it may be an exotic stellar remnant.

A longer study of radial velocity, using the HARPS echelle spectrometer, to follow up on Endl's findings, was published in a paper by M. Zechmeister et al. in 2013. The findings confirm that, quoting the paper, "ε Ind A has a steady long-term trend still explained by a planetary companion". This refined the radial-velocity trend observed and indicated a planetary companion with an orbital period greater than 30 years and a minimum mass of 0.97 M_{J}. The radial-velocity trend was observed through all the observations taken using the HARPS spectrometer, but due to the long period predicted for just one orbit of the object around ε Indi A, more than 30 years, the phase coverage was not yet complete.

In March 2018, a preprint was posted to arXiv that confirmed the existence of Epsilon Indi Ab using radial velocity measurements. In December 2019, the confirmation of this planet, along with updated parameters from both radial velocity and astrometry, was published by Fabo Feng et al. in Monthly Notices of the Royal Astronomical Society. This study found a semi-major axis of about 11.6 AU, an orbital period of about 45 years, an eccentricity of about 0.26, and a mass of 3.25 M_{J}. Updated orbital solutions were published in 2023, finding a higher eccentricity.

=== Direct imaging ===
A direct imaging attempt of this planet using the James Webb Space Telescope was performed in 2023, and the image was released in 2024. The detected planet's mass and orbit are different from what was predicted based on radial velocity and astrometry observations. The JWST and VLT/VISIR observations imply a super-Jupiter with a mass of about 6 Jupiter masses. The object is fainter than expected in the shorter wavelengths, which might be due to absorption by methane, carbon dioxide, and carbon monoxide commonly found in giant planets. This might be confirmed in the future with a spectrum. Alternatively this could be explained with a cloudy atmosphere. A second direct imaging attempt on this system to confirm the nature of this planet has been approved. The new orbital parameters were calculated with archived radial velocity data, the Hipparcos-Gaia astrometry of the host star and the position of the planet from the images. The planet has a semi-major axis of around 30 AU, an eccentricity of 0.4 and an inclination of 104°. The planet-star separation is 4.1 arcsec in JWST MIRI data and 4.8 arcsec in VLT VISIR data. It is undetected in VLT NaCo observations.

== Characteristics ==
The mass of Epsilon Indi Ab has been directly measured from radial velocity observations, absolute astrometry from the Hipparcos and Gaia spacecraft, and relative astrometry from direct imaging data. Sanghi et al. (2026) gives a value of 6.50+0.72
−0.59 Jupiter masses (M_{J}), while Matthews et al. (2026) gives 7.6±0.7 M_{J}. Integrating the planet's spectral energy distribution yields a luminosity of 5.89+0.42
−0.39×10^{−8} solar luminosities (L_{☉}).

The planet's radius and temperature have been estimated by comparing its mass, luminosity and age to predictions of evolutionary models. Adopting values of 6.50+0.72
−0.59 M_{J}, 5.89+0.42
−0.39×10^{−8} L_{☉} and 3.5±1.0 gigayears, Sanghi et al. (2026) obtained a radius of 1.038+0.012
−0.009 R_{J} and a temperature of 275 ± 5 K (1.85 ± 5.00 °C; 35.33 ± 9.00 °F) from CBPD2023 models. Using Sonora Bobcat models for near-solar metallicity, they obtained a radius of 1.051+0.013
−0.009 R_{J} and a temperature of 273 ± 5 K (−0.15 ± 5.00 °C; 31.73 ± 9.00 °F).

The temperature is similar to that of the nearby Y-dwarf WISE 0855−0714, 276 ± 9 K (2.85 ± 9.00 °C; 37.13 ± 16.20 °F), making Epsilon Indi Ab likely one of the coldest objects to be directly imaged outside the Solar System. At this temperature, which is warmer than Jupiter (T_{eff}=125 K [−148 °C; −235 °F]), but colder than 350 K, it is predicted that such an exoplanet could have water ice clouds and lower layers of sulfide clouds.

Matthews et al. (2026) analysed the planet's atmosphere with MIRI photometry, confirming the presence of ammonia. The ammonia feature is fainter than expected. The researchers attribute this to thick water-ice clouds, but it could also be caused by low metallicity or a nitrogen-depleted atmosphere. Sanghi et al. (2026) used NIRCam and MIRI photometry to build a spectral energy distribution of the planet. The NIRCam photometry supports a metal-enriched atmosphere, consistent with giant planet formation. A tentative find is that the water vapor absorption-dominated F2550W photometry is brighter than expected and could be better explained by a cloudy model.

The planet was observed with JWST using NIRSpec and MIRI spectroscopy. The planet spectrum is highly contaminated by stellar light. The researchers were able to filter out the planetary signal using the cross-correlation technique and were able to detect ammonia and water vapor. The signals of methane and carbon dioxide are weaker. Later, deuterated methane (CH_{3}D) was detected for the planet at high significance. The same study also found that Epsilon Indi Ab should have accreted deuterium-abundant solid materials in a very cold environment.

== See also ==
- Epsilon Eridani b and Gliese 832 b – other nearby Jupiter-like exoplanets
- TZ Arietis b
- List of nearest exoplanets
- List of directly imaged exoplanets
