= UGPS J072227.51−054031.2 =

Planetary-mass object in the constellation Monoceros

- Location of UGPS 0722−05 in the constellation Monoceros

Observation data Epoch J2000.0 Equinox J2000.0
- Constellation: Monoceros
- Right ascension: 07^{h} 22^{m} 27.29^{s}
- Declination: −05° 40′ 30.0″

Characteristics
- Spectral type: T9
- Apparent magnitude (i (AB SDSS)): 24.32±0.12
- Apparent magnitude (z): 20.51±0.09
- Apparent magnitude (Y): 17.37±0.02
- Apparent magnitude (J): 16.52±0.02
- Apparent magnitude (H): 16.90±0.02
- Apparent magnitude (K): 17.07±0.08
- Apparent magnitude (L'): 13.4±0.3
- Apparent magnitude (N): 10.28±0.24

Astrometry
Radial velocity (R_{v})	46.9±2.5 km/s
Proper motion (μ)	RA: −904.14±1.71 mas/yr Dec.: +352.025±1.21 mas/yr
Parallax (π)	242.8±2.4 mas
Distance	13.4 ± 0.1 ly (4.12 ± 0.04 pc)

Details
Mass	3 – 11 M_{Jup}
Radius	1.02±0.10 R_{Jup}
Luminosity (bolometric)	6.31+0.45 −0.28×10^{−7} L_{☉}
Surface gravity (log g)	(4.39±0.01) – (4.90±0.01)‍ cgs
Temperature	505±10 K
Rotational velocity (v sin i)	40±10 km/s
Age	0.06 to 1 Gyr

Other designations
- WISEPA J072227.27−054029.9, GJ 11075

Database references
SIMBAD	data

UGPS J072227.51−054031.2 (designation often abbreviated to UGPS 0722−05) is a sub-brown dwarf or rogue planet of late T type, located approximately 4.1 parsecs (13 light-years) from Earth. It is the second closest confirmed isolated substellar object, after WISE 0855-0714.

The object is roughly the volume of Jupiter, but is estimated to have 3–11 Jupiter masses (M_{J}). This would make it less massive than ε Indi Ba. As objects of this type below 13 Jupiter masses are thought to be more likely to be planets than brown dwarfs, it would either be classified as a planet or a sub-brown dwarf, depending on how it formed and the definition used. Infrared spectra shows the object contains water vapor and methane and has a surface temperature of approximately 480–560 kelvins.

== History of observations ==
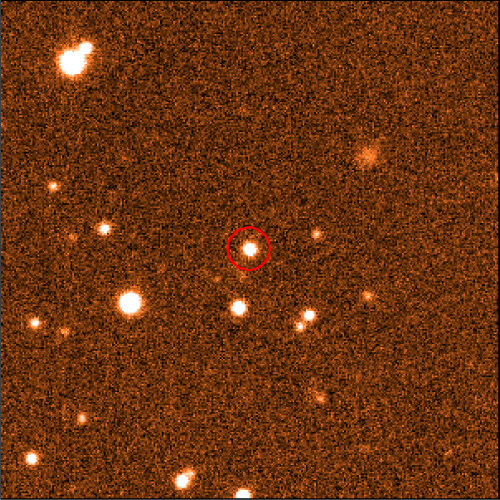
Near-infrared discovery image of UGPS J0722-05

UGPS 0722-05 was discovered by Philip Lucas at the University of Hertfordshire and announced in 2010. The discovery image was taken on 28 November 2006 by the UKIRT Infrared Deep Sky Survey (UKIDSS) with a recovery image confirming the object's proper motion on 2 March 2010.

It was initially reported to be at an even closer distance of 2.9 parsecs (9.5 light-years), which would have placed it among the ten nearest astronomical objects to the Sun, but later measurements revealed that the object was in fact located at a greater distance than initially thought, at 4.1+0.6
−0.5 parsecs (13.4+2.0
−1.6 light-years).

== Space motion ==
UGPS 0722−05 has proper motion of about 970 milliarcseconds per year.

Radial velocity of UGPS 0722-05, measured by Bochanski et al. and published in 2011, is 46.9±2.5 km/s. (Note: Positive value of radial velocity indicates that UGPS 0722−05 currently moves away from us. A significant excess of radial velocity (46.9 km/s) over tangential velocity (19 km/s) indicates that UGPS 0722-05 was much closer to us in past (assuming proper motion and parallax from Leggett et al. (2012), minimal distance from Solar system to UGPS 0722-05 was 5.0 ly about 72000 BC, and probably it was one of the nearest Solar neighbors at the time).)
