= 2MASS J21392676+0220226 =

Brown dwarf star in the constellation Aquarius

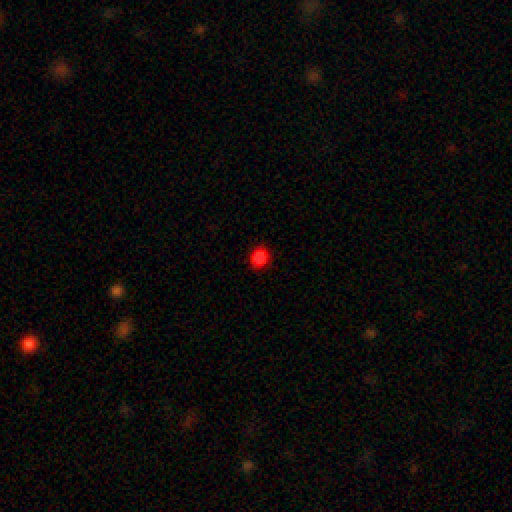
- 2MASS J21392676+0220226; Credit: legacy surveys

Observation data Epoch J2000 Equinox ICRS
- Constellation: Aquarius
- Right ascension: 21^{h} 39^{m} 26.769^{s}
- Declination: +02° 20′ 22.70″

Characteristics
- Spectral type: T1.5
- Apparent magnitude (J): 14.710
- Apparent magnitude (H): 14.16
- Apparent magnitude (K): 13.58

Astrometry
Radial velocity (R_{v})	−25.1±0.3 km/s
Proper motion (μ)	RA: 489.7±0.7 mas/yr Dec.: 125.0±0.8 mas/yr
Parallax (π)	96.5±1.1 mas
Distance	33.8 ± 0.4 ly (10.4 ± 0.1 pc)

Details
Mass	14.6+3.2 −1.6 M_{Jup}
Radius	1.17+0.02 −0.04 R_{Jup}
Surface gravity (log g)	4.42+0.12 −0.06 cgs
Temperature	1111+37 −42 K
Rotation	7.614±0.178 h
Age	200±50 Myr

Other designations
- CFBDS J213926+022023, 2MUCD 20912, WISEP J213927.09+022023.7

Database references
SIMBAD	data

2MASS J21392676+0220226 (or CFBDS J213926+02202) is a brown dwarf located 34 light-years (10 parsecs) from Earth in the constellation Aquarius. Its surface is thought to be host to a massive storm, resulting in large variability of its color. It is a member of the Carina-Near moving group. This brown dwarf was discovered in the Two Micron All-Sky Survey (2MASS).

The clouds on this brown dwarf are modelled as patchy, high-altitude forsterite cloud above a deeper, optically thick iron cloud. The silicate clouds cover 75–91% of the surface of this brown dwarf. An alternative model from around 2016 can explain the variability and atmosphere of this brown dwarf without clouds.

Once thought to be a binary object based on a 2010 study, it has since been shown to in fact be single.
