= Gliese 229 =

Star in the constellation Lepus

- Location of Gliese 229 in the constellation Lepus

Observation data Epoch J2000 Equinox ICRS
- Constellation: Lepus
- Right ascension: 06^{h} 10^{m} 34.61494^{s}
- Declination: −21° 51′ 52.6564″
- Apparent magnitude (V): 8.12

Characteristics

Gliese 229 A
- Spectral type: M1Ve
- U−B color index: +1.222
- B−V color index: +1.478
- Variable type: Flare star

Gliese 229 B
- Spectral type: T7 + T8

Astrometry

Gliese 229 A
Radial velocity (R_{v})	+4.23±0.12 km/s
Proper motion (μ)	RA: −135.692(11) mas/yr Dec.: −719.178(17) mas/yr
Parallax (π)	173.5740±0.0170 mas
Distance	18.791 ± 0.002 ly (5.7612 ± 0.0006 pc)
Absolute magnitude (M_{V})	9.326
Absolute bolometric magnitude (M_{bol})	7.96

Orbit
Primary	Gliese 229 A
Secondary	Gliese 229 B
Period (P)	349+37 −29 years
Semi-major axis (a)	42.9+3.0 −2.4 AU
Eccentricity (e)	0.736+0.014 −0.011
Inclination (i)	47.7+2.5 −2.9°
Longitude of the node (Ω)	168.3+0.3 −0.4°
Periastron epoch (T)	2,466,912+97 −63
Argument of periastron (ω) (secondary)	358.285+0.836 −0.846°
Semi-amplitude (K_{1}) (primary)	0.081674+0.001688 −0.001680 km/s

Orbit
Primary	Gliese 229 Ba
Secondary	Gliese 229 Bb
Period (P)	12.1343+0.0012 −0.0013 days
Semi-major axis (a)	0.0424±0.0004 AU
Eccentricity (e)	0.2306+0.0025 −0.0026
Inclination (i)	31.4+0.5 −0.6°
Longitude of the node (Ω)	210.4+1.5 −1.4°
Periastron epoch (T)	2,460,378.38±0.04
Argument of periastron (ω) (secondary)	3.2±1.1°

Details

Gliese 229 A
Mass	0.581±0.007 M_{☉}
Radius	0.549±0.043 R_{☉}
Luminosity (bolometric)	0.0430 L_{☉}
Surface gravity (log g)	4.695±0.035 cgs
Temperature	3,700 K
Metallicity	$\begin{smallmatrix}\left[\ce{M}/\ce{H}\right]\end{smallmatrix}$ = −0.02±0.06
Rotation	28.9±1.6 d
Rotational velocity (v sin i)	1 km/s

Gliese 229 Ba
Mass	37.7±1.1 M_{Jup}
Radius	0.81+0.05 −0.12 R_{Jup}
Luminosity (bolometric)	3.890+0.375 −0.342×10^{−6} L_{☉}
Surface gravity (log g)	5.15±0.04 cgs
Temperature	900+78 −29 K
Metallicity	$\begin{smallmatrix}\left[\ce{M}/\ce{H}\right]\end{smallmatrix}$ = 0.00+0.04 −0.03
Age	2.45±0.20 Gyr

Gliese 229 Bb
Mass	33.4±1.0 M_{Jup}
Radius	0.85+0.12 −0.05 R_{Jup}
Luminosity (bolometric)	2.630+0.254 −0.231×10^{−6} L_{☉}
Surface gravity (log g)	5.07+0.04 −0.011 cgs
Temperature	775+20 −33 K
Metallicity	$\begin{smallmatrix}\left[\ce{M}/\ce{H}\right]\end{smallmatrix}$ = 0.00+0.04 −0.03
Age	2.45±0.20 Gyr

Other designations
- NSV 2863, BD−21°1377, GJ 229, HD 42581, HIP 29295, SAO 171334, LHS 1827, TYC 5945-765-1

Database references
SIMBAD	A
- B
Exoplanet Archive	data

Gliese 229 (also written as Gl 229 or GJ 229) is a multiple system composed of a red dwarf and two brown dwarfs, located 18.8 light-years away. It is the nearest star system in the constellation Lepus. The primary component has 58% of the mass of the Sun, 55% of the Sun's radius, and a very low projected rotational velocity of 1 km/s at the stellar equator.

== Red dwarf ==
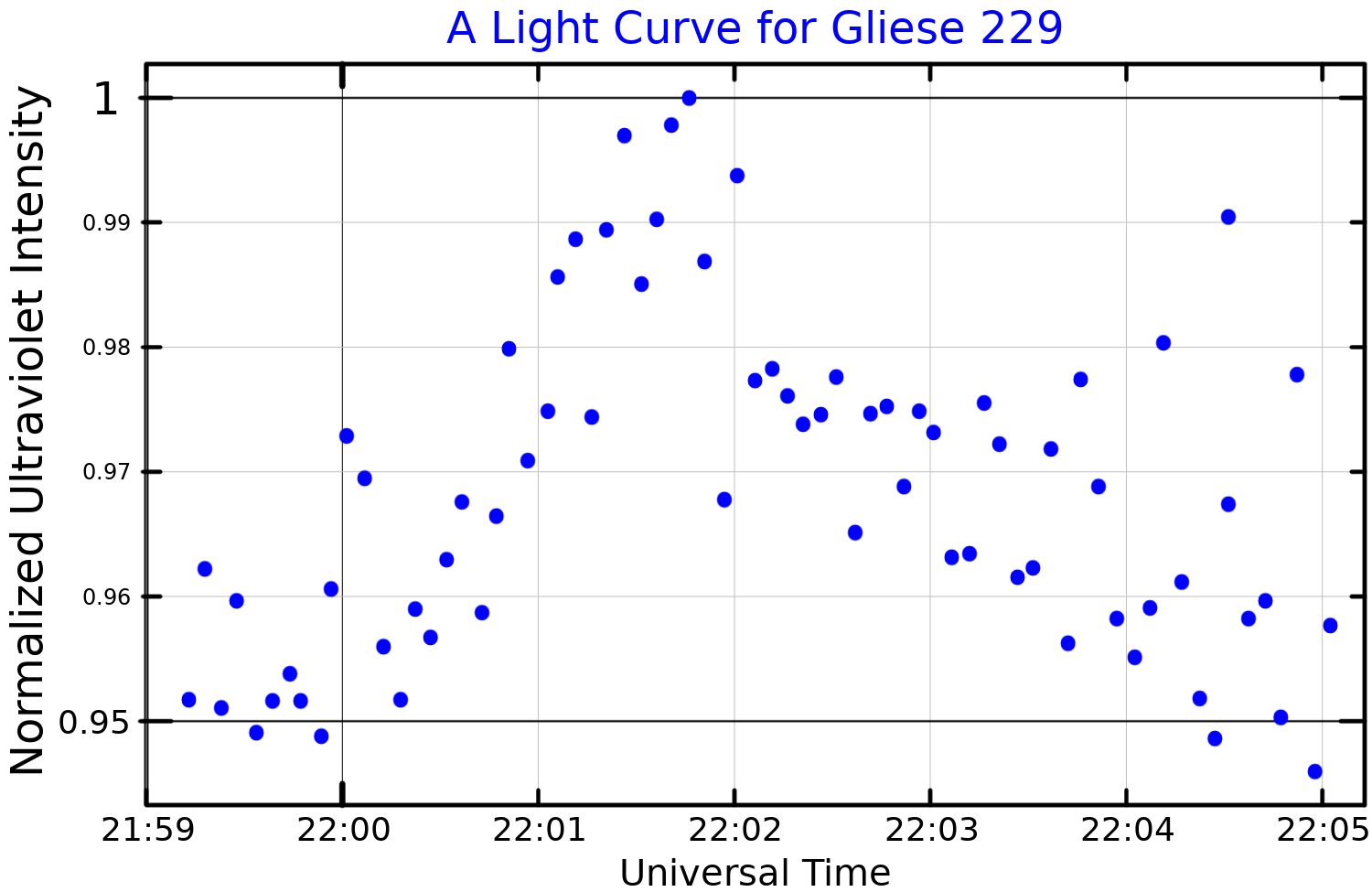
A light curve for Gliese 229 showing a small flare, adapted from Byrne et al. (1985)

Gliese 229 is known to be a low-activity flare star, which means it undergoes random increases in luminosity because of magnetic activity at the surface. The spectrum shows emission lines of calcium in the H and K bands. The emission of X-rays has been detected from the corona of this star. These may be caused by magnetic loops interacting with the gas of the star's outer atmosphere. No large-scale star-spot activity has been detected.

The space velocity components of this star are U = +12, V = –11 and W = –12 km/s. The orbit of this star through the Milky Way galaxy has an eccentricity of 0.07 and an orbital inclination of 0.29°.

== Brown dwarfs ==
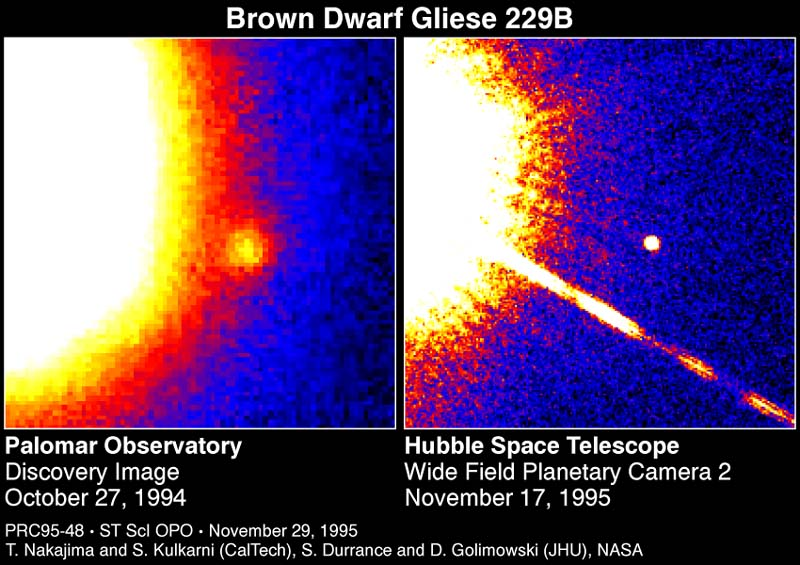
Gliese 229 A and B

A substellar companion was discovered in 1994 by Caltech astronomers Kulkarni, Tadashi Nakajima, Keith Matthews, and Rebecca Oppenheimer, and Johns Hopkins scientists Sam Durrance and David Golimowski. It was confirmed in 1995 as Gliese 229B, It was one of the first brown dwarfs discovered. Although too small to sustain hydrogen-burning nuclear fusion as in a main-sequence star, with a mass of around 40 to 60 times that of Jupiter (0.06 solar masses), it is still too massive to be a planet. As a brown dwarf, its core temperature is high enough to initiate the fusion of deuterium with a proton to form helium-3, but it is thought that it used up all its deuterium fuel long ago. This object has a surface temperature of 950 K.

Gliese 229B is the prototype of the T dwarfs, due to the detection of methane in its spectrum. It also shows other molecules in its atmosphere, namely water vapor, carbon monoxide and ammonia. Atomic absorption lines of caesium, sodium and potassium are also detected.

Gliese 229 B was later found to be a binary brown dwarf. Since 2021 it was suggested to be an unresolved binary, given the inconsistency between the object's measured mass and luminosity. Further evidence that Gliese 229B is an equal-mass binary comes from high-resolution spectroscopy from the Subaru Telescope. Gliese 229 B was then finally resolved in 2024 with VLT/GRAVITY and VLT/CRIRES+. The components are called Gliese 229 Ba and Gliese 229 Bb. The pair is a tight orbit with an orbital period of 12.1 days and a semi-major axis of 0.042 astronomical units (about 16 Earth-Moon distances). The changes in radial velocity extracted from CRIRES+ helped to resolve the orbit of Gliese 229B. The binary has an inclination of 31.4°±0.3° and an eccentricity of 0.234±0.004. The inclination of the binary is misaligned by 37+7
−10° in respect to the orbit of Gliese 229B around Gliese 229A. Additional radial velocity changes between two epochs were detected in Gliese 229B with Keck NIRSPEC. This team independently discovered the binarity of Gliese 229B.

The brown dwarf pair was observed with the James Webb Space Telescope's MIRI low-resolution spectroscopy. Previous works showed a difference in abundances between host star and companion in Gliese 229 from near-infrared spectra. This new study using mid-infrared data showed that the pair has abundances consistent with the host star. The metallicities were measured to be C/O = 0.65±0.05 and [M/H]=0.00+0.04
−0.03 and are equal for each brown dwarf in the pair. The host star has C/O = 0.68±0.12 and [M/H] = −0.02±0.06.

== Search for planets ==
In March 2014, a super-Neptune mass planet candidate was announced in a much closer-in orbit around GJ 229. Given the proximity of the Gliese 229 system to the Sun, the orbit of GJ 229 Ab might be fully characterized by the Gaia space-astrometry mission or via direct imaging. In 2020, a super-Earth mass planet was discovered around GJ 229. GJ 229 Ac orbits the star closer in than GJ 229 Ab, located towards the outer edge but still well inside the star's habitable zone and in that sense similar to Mars in our own Solar System. While considering GJ 229 Ab unconfirmed, the study estimated a significantly lower minimum mass for it.

However, a more recent study found that when stellar activity was taken in account, the radial velocity signals corresponding to the planets' orbital periods disappeared. Therefore, intrinsic activity of the host star or errors in the previous observations are the cause of the radial velocity variations, instead of planets, which mean Gliese 229 Ab and Gliese 229 Ac likely do not exist.

== See also ==
- Epsilon Indi
