= Adam Burgasser =

American astrophysicist

Adam J. Burgasser
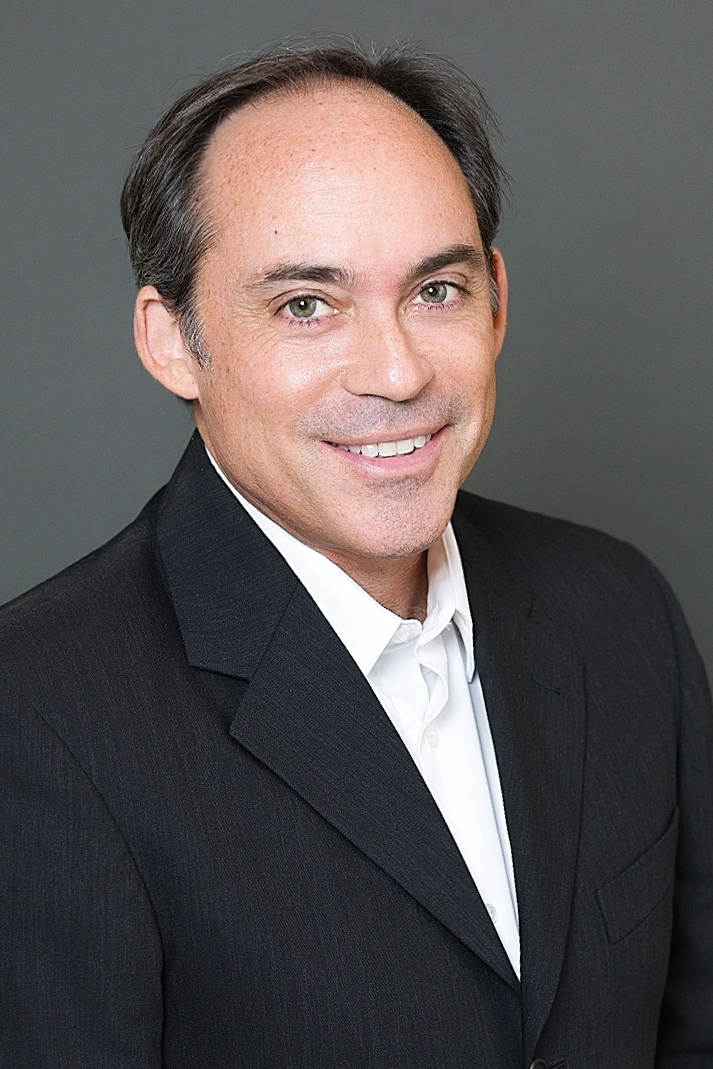
- Born: Buffalo, New York, U.S.
- Education: University of California, San Diego (BS); California Institute of Technology (MS, PhD); California Institute of Technology (MS, PhD)
- Known for: Definition of the T spectral class; brown dwarf research; TRAPPIST-1 host-star characterization
- Awards: Fellow of the American Astronomical Society (2026); Fulbright Scholar (2017–2018); Hubble Fellowship (2001–2004); NCAA Silver Anniversary Award (2021)
- Scientific career
- Fields: Astrophysics
- Workplaces: University of California, San Diego; Massachusetts Institute of Technology; American Museum of Natural History; University of California, Los Angeles
- Thesis: The Discovery and Characterization of Methane-bearing Brown Dwarfs and the Definition of the T Spectral Class (2002)
- Doctoral advisor: Michael E. Brown; J. Davy Kirkpatrick

Adam Jonathan Burgasser is an American astrophysicist and professor of astronomy and astrophysics at the University of California, San Diego (UC San Diego). His research concerns the lowest-mass stars, brown dwarfs, and exoplanet host stars. His doctoral work contributed to the definition of the T spectral class of brown dwarfs, and he was a member of the teams that discovered the seven Earth-sized planets orbiting the ultracool dwarf star TRAPPIST-1. He served as vice president of the American Astronomical Society (AAS) from 2021 to 2024 and was named a Fellow of the AAS in 2026. As an undergraduate he was an NCAA Division III national champion springboard diver.

== Early life and education ==
Burgasser was raised in Buffalo, New York, and graduated from Sweet Home High School. He received a BS in physics with highest distinction from UC San Diego in 1996, where he worked as an undergraduate researcher with astronaut Sally Ride. As a UC San Diego undergraduate he competed in springboard diving, winning the 1996 NCAA Division III national championship in the 3-meter event and being named Division III Diver of the Year; he was a seven-time All-American.

He earned an MS (1999) and a PhD in physics with a minor in planetary science from the California Institute of Technology, where he was advised by Michael E. Brown and J. Davy Kirkpatrick. His dissertation, The Discovery and Characterization of Methane-bearing Brown Dwarfs and the Definition of the T Spectral Class, presented the discovery of methane-bearing brown dwarfs and helped establish the T spectral classification.

== Career ==
Burgasser was a Hubble Postdoctoral Fellow at the University of California, Los Angeles from 2001 to 2004 and a Spitzer Postdoctoral Fellow at the American Museum of Natural History from 2004 to 2005. He then joined the physics faculty of the Massachusetts Institute of Technology before moving to UC San Diego in 2010. He is a professor in, and founding faculty member of, UC San Diego's Department of Astronomy and Astrophysics, established in 2023. He was a Fulbright Scholar at the University of Exeter in 2017–2018.

In April 2017, Burgasser testified before the United States House Committee on Science, Space, and Technology at a hearing on advances in the search for life beyond Earth.

Within the American Astronomical Society, Burgasser served as a councilor/trustee (2016–2019) and as vice president (2021–2024), and chaired the AAS Committee on the Status of Minorities in Astronomy from 2013 to 2016. He served on a science panel of the Astro2020 decadal survey.

== Research ==
Burgasser's research focuses on ultracool dwarfs — very-low-mass stars and brown dwarfs — including their discovery, spectral classification, atmospheres, multiplicity, and use as probes of Galactic structure. Working with data from the Two Micron All Sky Survey, he co-authored early discoveries of L and T dwarfs, and his papers on the near-infrared spectra of T dwarfs established a classification scheme for the class. He created the SpeX Prism Library, an archive of low-resolution near-infrared spectra of ultracool dwarfs, and the associated SPLAT analysis toolkit.

Burgasser was a co-author of the 2016 and 2017 Nature papers reporting the discovery of Earth-sized planets transiting TRAPPIST-1, contributing characterization of the ultracool host star, and led a 2017 study with Eric Mamajek estimating the age of the TRAPPIST-1 system at 5.4–9.8 billion years.

In 2024, he led a study of CWISE J124909.08+362116.0, a low-mass star or brown dwarf identified by Backyard Worlds: Planet 9 citizen scientists that is moving fast enough to escape the Milky Way's gravity. In 2025 he led the team reporting the first clear detection of phosphine in a brown dwarf atmosphere, in the object Wolf 1130C, published in Science.

== Equity, education, and outreach ==
Burgasser co-organized the first Inclusive Astronomy conference at Vanderbilt University in 2015, directs the UC-HBCU physics bridge program linking UC San Diego with Morehouse College and Spelman College, and has served on the steering committee of the Cal-Bridge program. He received UC San Diego's Equal Opportunity/Affirmative Action and Diversity Award in 2014, the UC San Diego Academic Senate Distinguished Teaching Award in 2016, and the School of Physical Sciences Equity, Diversity and Inclusion Excellence Award in 2023.

With education researcher Genevive Bjorn, Burgasser co-authored How to Critically Read the Scientific Research Literature: Introducing the CERIC Method (Cambridge University Press, 2026), a guide to critical reading of primary scientific literature. He delivered a plenary lecture at the 247th AAS meeting in January 2026 on brown dwarfs as tracers of Galactic archaeology.

== Diving ==
Burgasser won the NCAA Division III national championship in 3-meter springboard diving in 1996 and was named the Division III Diver of the Year. He received the NCAA Silver Anniversary Award in 2021, the first UC San Diego recipient, and was inducted into the UC San Diego Athletics Hall of Fame in 2023.

== Selected publications ==
- Burgasser, Adam J.; et al. (2002). "The Spectra of T Dwarfs. I. Near-Infrared Data and Spectral Classification". The Astrophysical Journal. 564 (1): 421–451. arXiv:astro-ph/0108452. Bibcode:2002ApJ...564..421B. doi:10.1086/324033.
- Burgasser, Adam J.; Geballe, T. R.; Leggett, S. K.; Kirkpatrick, J. Davy; Golimowski, David A. (2006). "A Unified Near-Infrared Spectral Classification Scheme for T Dwarfs". The Astrophysical Journal. 637 (2): 1067–1093. arXiv:astro-ph/0510090. Bibcode:2006ApJ...637.1067B. doi:10.1086/498563.
- Gillon, Michaël; et al. (2017). "Seven temperate terrestrial planets around the nearby ultracool dwarf star TRAPPIST-1". Nature. 542 (7642): 456–460. arXiv:1703.01424. Bibcode:2017Natur.542..456G. doi:10.1038/nature21360. PMC 5330437. PMID 28230125.
- Burgasser, Adam J.; et al. (2025). "Observation of undepleted phosphine in the atmosphere of a low-temperature brown dwarf". Science. 390: 697–701. doi:10.1126/science.adu0401.
- Bjorn, Genevive; Burgasser, Adam J. (2026). How to Critically Read the Scientific Research Literature: Introducing the CERIC Method. Cambridge University Press. doi:10.1017/9781009631266. ISBN 9781009631273.
