= Collision-induced absorption and emission =

Spectral features due to inelastic interactions

In spectroscopy, collision-induced absorption and emission refers to spectral features generated by inelastic collisions of molecules in a gas. Such inelastic collisions (along with the absorption or emission of photons) may induce quantum transitions in the molecules, or the molecules may form transient supramolecular complexes with spectral features different from the underlying molecules. Collision-induced absorption and emission is particularly important in dense gases, such as hydrogen and helium clouds found in astronomical systems.

Collision-induced absorption and emission is distinguished from collisional broadening in spectroscopy in that collisional broadening comes from elastic collisions of molecules, whereas collision-induced absorption and emission is an inherently inelastic process.

== Collision-induced spectra of gases ==
Ordinary spectroscopy is concerned with the spectra of single atoms or molecules. Here we outline the very different spectra of complexes consisting of two or more interacting atoms or molecules: the "interaction-induced" or "collision-induced" spectroscopy. Both ordinary and collision-induced spectra may be observed in emission and absorption and require an electric or magnetic multipole moment - in most cases an electric dipole moment - to exist for an optical transition to take place from an initial to a final quantum state of a molecule or a molecular complex. (For brevity of expression we will use here the term "molecule" interchangeably for atoms as well as molecules). A complex of interacting molecules may consist of two or more molecules in a collisional encounter, or else of a weakly bound van der Waals molecule. On first sight, it may seem strange to treat optical transitions of a collisional complex, which may exist just momentarily, for the duration of a fly-by encounter (roughly 10^{−13} seconds), in much the same way as this was long done for molecules in ordinary spectroscopy. But even transient complexes of molecules may be viewed as a new, "supermolecular" system which is subject to the same spectroscopic rules as ordinary molecules. Ordinary molecules may be viewed as complexes of atoms that have new and possibly quite different spectroscopic properties than the individual atoms the molecule consists of, when the atoms are not bound together as a molecule (or are not "interacting"). Similarly, complexes of interacting molecules may (and usually do) acquire new optical properties, which often are absent in the non-interacting, well separated individual molecules.

Collision-induced absorption (CIA) and emission (CIE) spectra are well known in the microwave and infrared regions of the electromagnetic spectrum, but they occur in special cases also in the visible and near ultraviolet regions. Collision-induced spectra have been observed in nearly all dense gases, and also in many liquids and solids. CIA and CIE are due to the intermolecular interactions, which generate electric dipole moments. We note that an analogous collision-induced light scattering (CILS) or Raman process also exists, which is well studied and is in many ways completely analogous to CIA and CIE. CILS arises from interaction-induced polarizability increments of molecular complexes; the excess polarizability of a complex, relative the sum of polarizabilities of the noninteracting molecules.

== Interaction-induced dipoles ==
Molecules interact at close range through intermolecular forces (the "van der Waals forces"), which cause minute shifts of the electron density distributions (relative the distributions of electrons when the molecules are not interacting). Intermolecular forces are repulsive at near range, where electron exchange forces dominate the interaction, and attractive at somewhat greater separations, where the dispersion forces are active. (If separations are further increased, all intermolecular forces fall off rapidly and may be totally neglected.) Repulsion and attraction are due, respectively, to the small defects or excesses of electron densities of molecular complexes in the space between the interacting molecules, which often result in interaction-induced electric dipole moments that contribute some to interaction-induced emission and absorption intensities. The resulting dipoles are referred to as exchange force-induced dipole and dispersion force-induced dipoles, respectively.

Other dipole induction mechanisms also exist in molecular (as opposed to monatomic) gases and in mixtures of gases, when molecular gases are present. Molecules have centers of positive charge (the nuclei), which are surrounded by a cloud of electrons. Molecules thus may be thought of being surrounded by various electric multipolar fields which will polarize any collisional partner momentarily in a fly-by encounter, generating the so-called multipole-induced dipoles. In diatomic molecules such as H_{2} and N_{2}, the lowest-order multipole moment is the quadrupole, followed by a hexadecapole, etc., hence the quadrupole-induced, hexadecapole-induced,... dipoles. Especially the former is often the strongest, most significant of the induced dipoles contributing to CIA and CIE. Other induced dipole mechanisms exist. In collisional systems involving molecules of three or more atoms (CO_{2}, CH_{4}...), collisional frame distortion may be an important induction mechanism. Collision-induced emission and absorption by simultaneous collisions of three or more particles generally do involve pairwise-additive dipole components, as well as important irreducible dipole contributions and their spectra.

== Historical sketch ==
Collision-induced absorption was first reported in compressed oxygen gas in 1949 by Harry Welsch and associates at frequencies of the fundamental band of the O_{2} molecule. (Note that an unperturbed O_{2} molecule, like all other diatomic homonuclear molecules, is infrared inactive on account of the inversion symmetry and does thus not possess a "dipole allowed" rotovibrational spectrum at any frequency).

== Collision-induced spectra ==
Molecular fly-by collisions take little time, something like 10^{−13} s. Optical transition of collisional complexes of molecules generate spectral "lines" that are very broad - roughly five orders of magnitude broader than the most familiar "ordinary" spectral lines (Heisenberg's uncertainty relation). The resulting spectral "lines" usually strongly overlap so that collision-induced spectral bands typically appear as continua (as opposed to the bands of often discernible lines of ordinary molecules).

Collision-induced spectra appear at the frequencies of the rotovibrational and electronic transition bands of the unperturbed molecules, and also at sums and differences of such transition frequencies: simultaneous transitions in two (or more) interacting molecules are well known to generate optical transitions of molecular complexes.

== Virial expansions of spectral intensities ==
Intensities of spectra of individual atoms or molecules typically vary linearly with the numerical gas density. However, if gas densities are sufficiently increased, quite generally contributions may also be observed that vary as density squared, cubed... These are the collision-induced spectra of two-body (and quite possibly three-body,...) collisional complexes. The collision-induced spectra have sometimes been separated from the continua of individual atoms and molecules, based on the characteristic density dependences. In other words, a virial expansion in terms of powers of the numerical gas density is often observable, just as this is widely known for the virial expansion of the equation of state of compressed gases. The first term of the expansion, which is linear in density, represents the ideal gas (or ordinary) spectra where these exist. (This first term vanishes for the infrared inactive gases,) And the quadratic, cubic,... terms of the virial expansions arise from optical transitions of binary, ternary,... intermolecular complexes, which are (often unjustifyably) neglected in the ideal gas approximation of spectroscopy.

== Spectra of van der Waals molecules ==
Two kinds of complexes of molecules exist: the collisional complexes discussed above, which are short lived. Besides, bound (i.e. relatively stable) complexes of two or more molecules exist, the so-called van der Waals molecules. These exist usually for much longer times than the collisional complexes and, under carefully chosen experimental conditions (low temperature, moderate gas density), their rotovibrational band spectra show "sharp" (or resolvable) lines (Heisenberg uncertainty principle), much like ordinary molecules. If the parent molecules are nonpolar, the same induced dipole mechanisms, which are discussed above, are responsible for the observable spectra of van der Waals molecules.

Figure 1 (to be included)

== An example of CIA spectra ==
Figure 1 shows an example of a collision-induced absorption spectra of H_{2}-He complexes at a variety of temperatures. The spectra were computed from the fundamental theory, using quantum chemical methods, and were shown to be in close agreement with laboratory measurements at temperatures, where such measurements exist (for temperatures around 300 K and lower). The intensity scale of the figure is highly compressed. At the lowest temperature (300 K), a series of six striking maxima is seen, with deep minima between them. The broad maxima roughly coincide with the H_{2} vibrational bands. With increasing temperature, the minima become less striking and disappear at the highest temperature (curve at the top, for the temperature of 9000 K).

A similar picture is to be expected for the CIA spectra of pure hydrogen gas (i.e. without admixed gases) and, in fact for the CIA spectra of many other gases. The main difference, say if nitrogen CIA spectra are considered instead of those of hydrogen gas, would be a much closer spacing, if not a total overlapping, of the diverse CIA bands which appear roughly at the frequencies of the vibrational bands of the N_{2} molecule.

== Significance ==
The significance of CIA for astrophysics was recognized early-on, especially where dense atmospheres of mixtures of molecular hydrogen and helium gas exist.

=== Planets ===
Herzberg pointed out direct evidence of H_{2} molecules in the atmospheres of the outer planets. The atmospheres of the inner planets and of Saturn's big moon Titan also show significant CIA in the infrared due to concentrations of nitrogen, oxygen, carbon dioxide and other molecular gases. However, the total CIA contribution of Earth's major gases, N_{2} and O_{2}, to the atmosphere's natural greenhouse effect is relatively minor except near the poles. Extrasolar planets have been discovered with hot atmospheres (a thousand kelvin or more) which otherwise resemble Jupiter's atmosphere (mixtures of mostly H_{2} and He) where relatively strong CIA exists.

=== Cool white dwarf stars ===
Stars that burn hydrogen are called main sequence (MS) stars - these are by far the most common objects in the night sky. When the hydrogen fuel is exhausted and temperatures begin to fall, the object undergoes various transformations and a white dwarf star is eventually born, the ember of the expired MS star. Temperatures of a new-born white dwarf may be in the hundreds of thousand kelvin, but if the mass of the white dwarf is less than just a few solar masses, burning of ^{4}He to ^{12}C and ^{16}O is not possible and the star will slowly cool down forever. The coolest white dwarfs observed have temperatures of roughly 4000 K, which must mean that the universe is not old enough so that lower temperature stars cannot be found. The emission spectra of "cool" white dwarfs does not at all look like a Planck blackbody spectrum. Instead, nearly the whole infrared is attenuated or missing altogether from the star's emission, owing to CIA in the hydrogen-helium atmospheres surrounding their cores. The impact of CIA on the observed spectral energy distribution is well understood and accurately modeled for most cool white dwarfs. For white dwarfs with a mix H/He atmosphere, the intensity of the H_{2}-He CIA can be used to infer the hydrogen abundance at the white dwarf photosphere. However, predicting CIA in the atmospheres of the coolest white dwarfs is more challenging, in part because of the formation of many-body collisional complexes.

=== Other cool stars ===
The atmospheres of low metallicity cool stars are composed primarily of hydrogen and helium. Collision-induced absorption by H_{2}-H_{2} and H_{2}-He transient complexes will be a more or less important opacity source of their atmospheres. For example, CIA in the H_{2} fundamental band, which falls on top of an opacity window between H_{2}O/CH_{4} or H_{2}O/CO (depending on the temperature), plays an important role in shaping brown dwarf spectra. Higher gravity brown dwarf stars often show even stronger CIA, owing to the density squared dependence of CIA intensities, when other "ordinary" opacity sources are linearly dependent on density. CIA is also important in low-metallicity brown dwarfs, since "low metallicity" means reduced CNO (and other) elemental abundances compared to H_{2} and He, and thus stronger CIA compared to H_{2}O, CO, and CH_{4} absorption. CIA absorption of H_{2}-X collisional complexes is thus an important diagnostic of high-gravity and low-metallicity brown dwarfs. All of this is also true of the M dwarfs, but to a lesser extent. M dwarf atmospheres are hotter so that some increased portion of the H_{2} molecules is in the dissociated state, which weakens CIA by H_{2}--X complexes. The significance of CIA for cool astronomical objects was long suspected or known to some degree.

=== First stars ===
Attempts to model the formation of the "first" star from the pure hydrogen and helium gas clouds below about 10,000 K show that the heat generated in the gravitational contraction phase must be somehow radiatively released for further cooling to be possible. This is no problem as long as temperatures are still high enough so that free electrons exist: electrons are efficient emitters when interacting with neutrals (bremsstrahlung). However, at the lower temperatures in neutral gases, the recombination of hydrogen atoms to H_{2} molecules is a process that generates enormous amounts of heat that must somehow be radiated away in CIE processes; if CIE were non-existing, molecule formation could not take place and temperatures could not fall further. Only CIE processes permit further cooling, so that molecular hydrogen will accumulate. A dense, cool environment will thus develop so that a gravitational collapse and star formation can actually proceed.

== Database ==
Because of the great importance of many types of CIA spectra in planetary and astrophysical research, a well known spectroscopy database (HITRAN) has been expanded to include a number of CIA spectra in various frequency bands and for a variety of temperatures.
