= Epsilon Indi =

Star system in the constellation of Indus

- Location of ε Indi (circled)

Observation data Epoch J2000.0 Equinox ICRS
- Constellation: Indus
- Right ascension: 22^{h} 03^{m} 21.65363^{s}
- Declination: −56° 47′ 09.5228″
- Apparent magnitude (V): 4.674±0.006

Characteristics
- Evolutionary stage: main sequence
- Spectral type: K5V + T1 + T6
- U−B color index: 1.00
- B−V color index: 1.056±0.016

Astrometry

ε Ind A
Radial velocity (R_{v})	−40.4+0.9 −0.8 km/s
Proper motion (μ)	RA: +3,966.661 mas/yr Dec.: −2,536.192 mas/yr
Parallax (π)	274.8431±0.0956 mas
Distance	11.867 ± 0.004 ly (3.638 ± 0.001 pc)
Absolute magnitude (M_{V})	6.89

ε Ind Ba/Bb
Proper motion (μ)	RA: +3,981.977 mas/yr Dec.: −2,466.832 mas/yr
Parallax (π)	270.6580±0.6896 mas
Distance	12.05 ± 0.03 ly (3.695 ± 0.009 pc)

Orbit
Primary	ε Ind Ba
Name	ε Ind Bb
Period (P)	11.0197 ± 0.0076 yr
Semi-major axis (a)	661.58 ± 0.37 mas (2.4058 ± 0.0040 au)
Eccentricity (e)	0.54042 ± 0.00063
Inclination (i)	77.082 ± 0.032°
Longitude of the node (Ω)	147.959 ± 0.023°
Argument of periastron (ω) (secondary)	328.27 ± 0.12°

Details

ε Ind A
Mass	0.782±0.023 M_{☉}
Radius	0.713±0.006 R_{☉}
Luminosity	0.21±0.02 L_{☉}
Surface gravity (log g)	4.50±0.07 cgs
Temperature	4,649±65 K
Metallicity [Fe/H]	−0.17±0.04 dex
Rotation	35.732+0.006 −0.003 days
Rotational velocity (v sin i)	2.00 km/s
Age	3.5+0.8 −1.0 Gyr

ε Ind Ba
Mass	66.92±0.36 M_{Jup}
Radius	0.080–0.081 R_{☉}
Luminosity	2.04×10^{−5} L_{☉}
Surface gravity (log g)	5.365±0.006 cgs
Temperature	1,312±13 K

ε Ind Bb
Mass	53.25±0.29 M_{Jup}
Radius	0.082–0.083 R_{☉}
Luminosity	5.97×10^{−6} L_{☉}
Surface gravity (log g)	5.288±0.003 cgs
Temperature	972±13 K

Other designations
- ε Ind, CD−57°8464, CPD−57°10015, FK5 825, GJ 845, HD 209100, HIP 108870, HR 8387, SAO 247287, LHS 67, PLX 5314.00, UGP 544
- B: CI Ind

Database references
SIMBAD	The system
- A
- Bab
- Bab (as X-ray source)
Exoplanet Archive	data
ARICNS	data

Epsilon Indi, Latinized from ε Indi, is a star system located at a distance of approximately 12 light-years from Earth in the southern constellation of Indus. The star has an orange hue and is faintly visible to the naked eye with an apparent visual magnitude of 4.674. It consists of a K-type main-sequence star, ε Indi A, and two brown dwarfs, ε Indi Ba and ε Indi Bb, in a wide orbit around it. The brown dwarfs were discovered in 2003. ε Indi Ba is an early T dwarf (T1) and ε Indi Bb a late T dwarf (T6) separated by 0.6 arcseconds, with a projected distance of 1460 AU from their primary star.

ε Indi A has one known planet, ε Indi Ab, with a mass of 6.31 Jupiter masses in an elliptical orbit with a period of about 171.3 years. ε Indi Ab is the second-closest Jovian exoplanet, after ε Eridani b. The ε Indi system provides a benchmark case for the study of the formation of gas giants and brown dwarfs.

== Observation ==
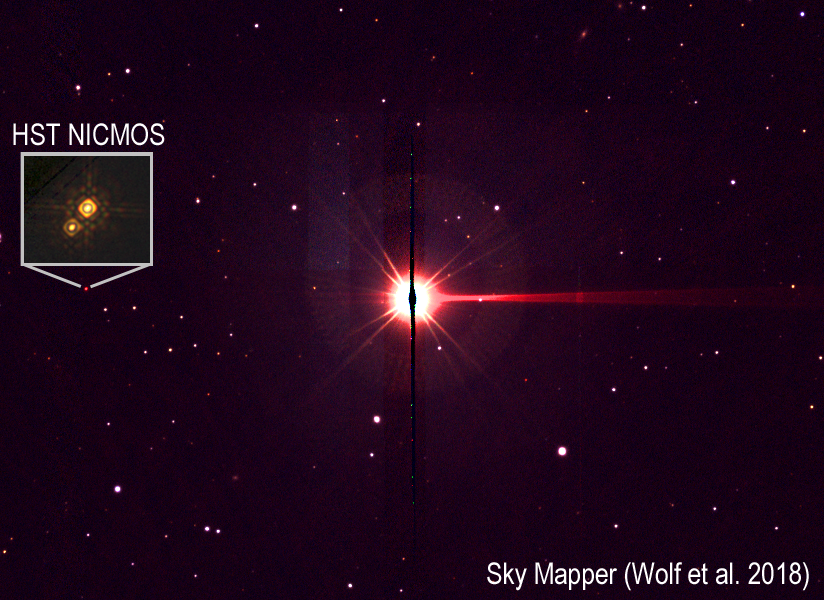
Epsilon Indi with SkyMapper and a Hubble NICMOS image of the brown dwarf binary

The constellation Indus (the Indian) first appeared in Johann Bayer's celestial atlas Uranometria in 1603. The 1801 star atlas Uranographia, by German astronomer Johann Elert Bode, places ε Indi as one of the arrows being held in the left hand of the Indian.

In 1847, Heinrich Louis d'Arrest compared the position of this star in several catalogues dating back to 1750, and discovered that it possessed a measureable proper motion. That is, he found that the star had changed position across the celestial sphere over time. In 1882–3, the parallax of ε Indi was measured by astronomers David Gill and William L. Elkin at the Cape of Good Hope. They derived a parallax estimate of 0.22 ± 0.03 arcseconds. In 1923, Harlow Shapley of the Harvard Observatory derived a parallax of 0.45 arcseconds.

In 1972, the Copernicus satellite was used to examine this star for the emission of ultraviolet laser signals. Again, the result was negative. ε Indi leads a list, compiled by Margaret Turnbull and Jill Tarter of the Carnegie Institution in Washington, of 17,129 nearby stars most likely to have planets that could support complex life.

The star is among five nearby paradigms as K-type stars of a type in a 'sweet spot' between Sun-analog stars and M stars for the likelihood of evolved life, per analysis of Giada Arney from NASA's Goddard Space Flight Center.

== Characteristics ==
ε Indi A is a main-sequence star of spectral type K5V. The star has only about three-fourths the mass of the Sun and 71% of the Sun's radius. Its surface gravity is slightly higher than the Sun's. The metallicity of a star is the proportion of elements with higher atomic numbers than helium, being typically represented by the ratio of iron to hydrogen compared to the same ratio for the Sun; ε Indi A is found to have about 87% of the Sun's proportion of iron in its photosphere.

The corona of ε Indi A is similar to the Sun, with an X-ray luminosity of 2×10^{27} ergs s^{−1} (2×10^{20} W) and an estimated coronal temperature of 2×10^{6} K. The stellar wind of this star expands outward, producing a bow shock at a distance of 63 AU. Downstream of the bow, the termination shock reaches as far as 140 AU from the star.

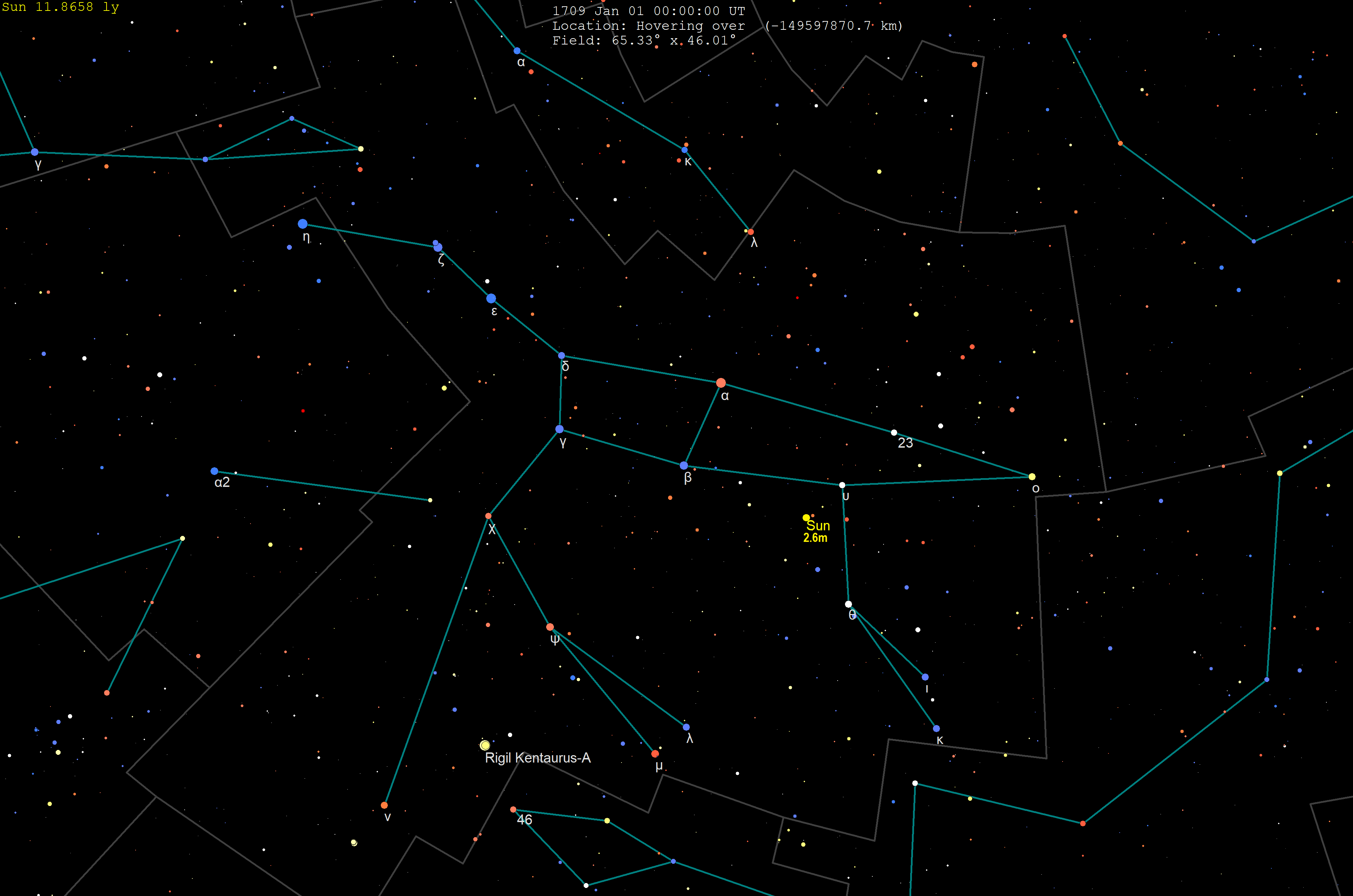
Position of Sun and α Centauri in Ursa Major as seen from ε Indi

This star has the third highest proper motion of any star visible to the unaided eye, after Groombridge 1830 and 61 Cygni, and the ninth highest overall. This motion will move the star into the constellation Tucana around 2640 AD. ε Indi A has a space velocity relative to the Sun of 86 km/s, (Note: The space velocity components are: U = −77; V = −38, and W = +4. This yields a net space velocity of $\begin{smallmatrix}\sqrt{77^2\ +\ 38^2\ +\ 4^2}\ =\ 86\end{smallmatrix}$ km/s.) which is unusually high for what is considered a young star. It is thought to be a member of the ε Indi moving group of at least sixteen population I stars. This is an association of stars that have similar space velocity vectors, and therefore most likely formed at the same time and location. ε Indi will make its closest approach to the Sun in about 17,500 years when it makes perihelion passage at a distance of around 10.58 light-years (3.245 pc).

As seen from ε Indi, the Sun is a 2.6-magnitude star in Ursa Major, near the bowl of the Big Dipper. (Note: From ε Indi the Sun would appear on the diametrically opposite side of the sky at the coordinates RA=10^{h} 03^{m} 21^{s}, Dec=56° 47′ 10″, which is located near Beta Ursae Majoris. The absolute magnitude of the Sun is 4.8, so, at a distance of 3.63 parsecs, the Sun would have an apparent magnitude $\begin{smallmatrix}m\ =\ M_v\ +\ 5\cdot((\log_{10}\ 3.63)\ -\ 1)\ =\ 2.6\end{smallmatrix}$.)

== Brown dwarfs ==
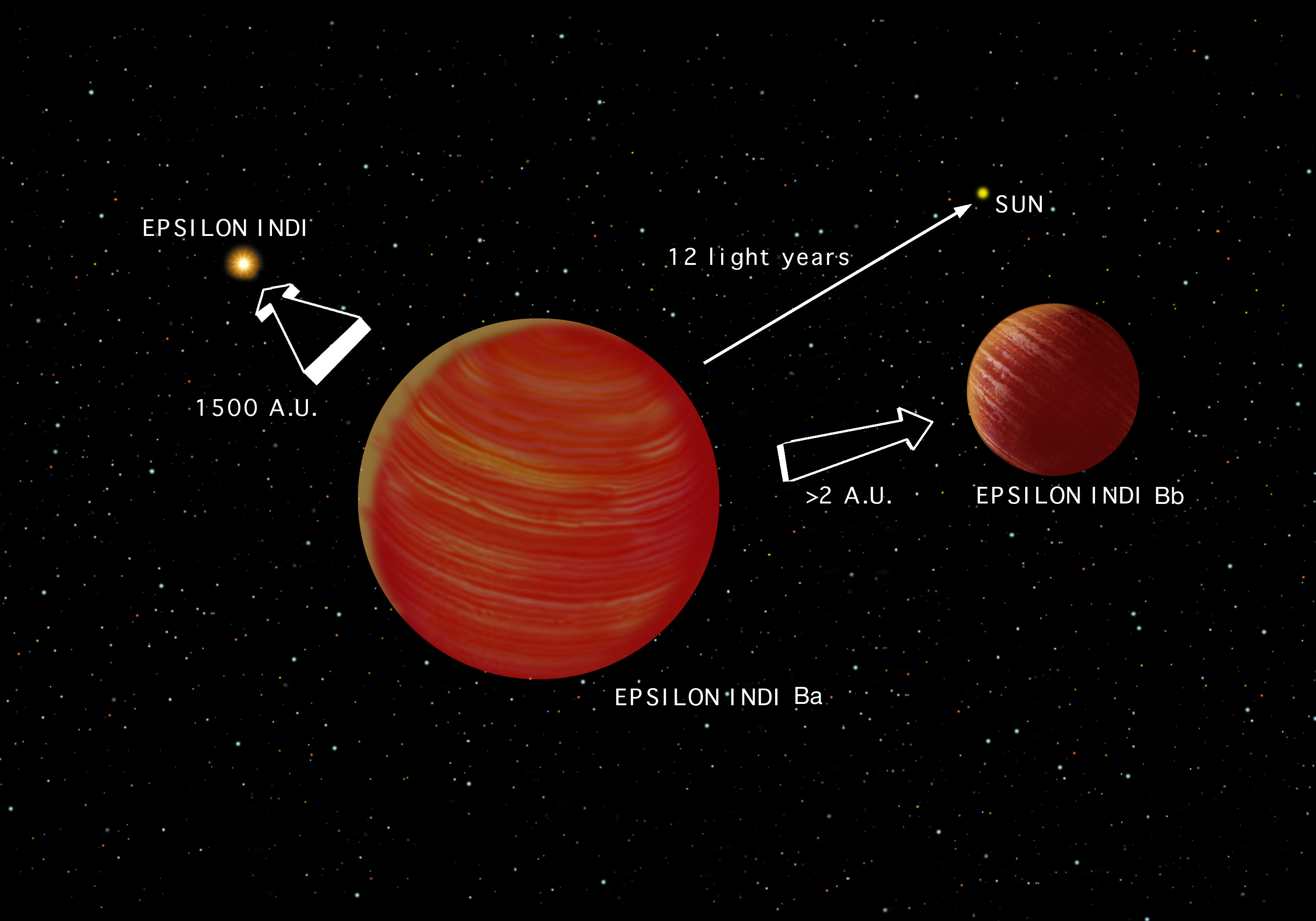
Artist's conception of the Epsilon Indi system showing Epsilon Indi A and its brown-dwarf binary companions. The labels give the initial minimum measurement of the distance between Epsilon Indi A and the binary.

In January 2003, astronomers announced the discovery of a brown dwarf with a mass of 40 to 60 Jupiter masses in orbit around ε Indi A with a projected separation on the sky of about 1,500 AU. In August 2003, astronomers discovered that this brown dwarf was actually a binary brown dwarf, with an apparent separation of 2.1 AU and an orbital period of about 15 years. Both brown dwarfs are of spectral class T; the more massive component, ε Indi Ba, is of spectral type T1–T1.5 and the less massive component, ε Indi Bb, of spectral type T6. More recent parallax measurements with the Gaia spacecraft place the ε Indi B binary about 11,600 AU (0.183 lightyears) away from ε Indi A, along line of sight from Earth.

Evolutionary models have been used to estimate the physical properties of these brown dwarfs from spectroscopic and photometric measurements. These yield masses of 47 ± 10 and 28 ± 7 times the mass of Jupiter, and radii of 0.091 ± 0.005 and 0.096 ± 0.005 solar radii, for ε Indi Ba and ε Indi Bb, respectively. The effective temperatures are 1300–1340 K and 880–940 K, while the log g (cm s^{−1}) surface gravities are 5.50 and 5.25, and their luminosities are 1.9 × 10^{−5} and 4.5 × 10^{−6} the luminosity of the Sun. They have an estimated metallicity of [M/H] = –0.2.

The brown dwarf pair is variable, and has received the variable star designation CI Indi.

== Planetary system ==
The Epsilon Indi A planetary system
Companion (in order from star)	Mass	Semimajor axis (AU)	Orbital period (years)	Eccentricity	Inclination (°)	Radius
b	6.50+0.72 −0.59 M_{J} 7.6±0.7 M_{J}	15.76+1.73 −1.39; 20.9+5.8 −3.3	70+12 −9; 108+49 −25	0.25±0.09	102.2±1.7	1.038+0.012 −0.009 R_{J}

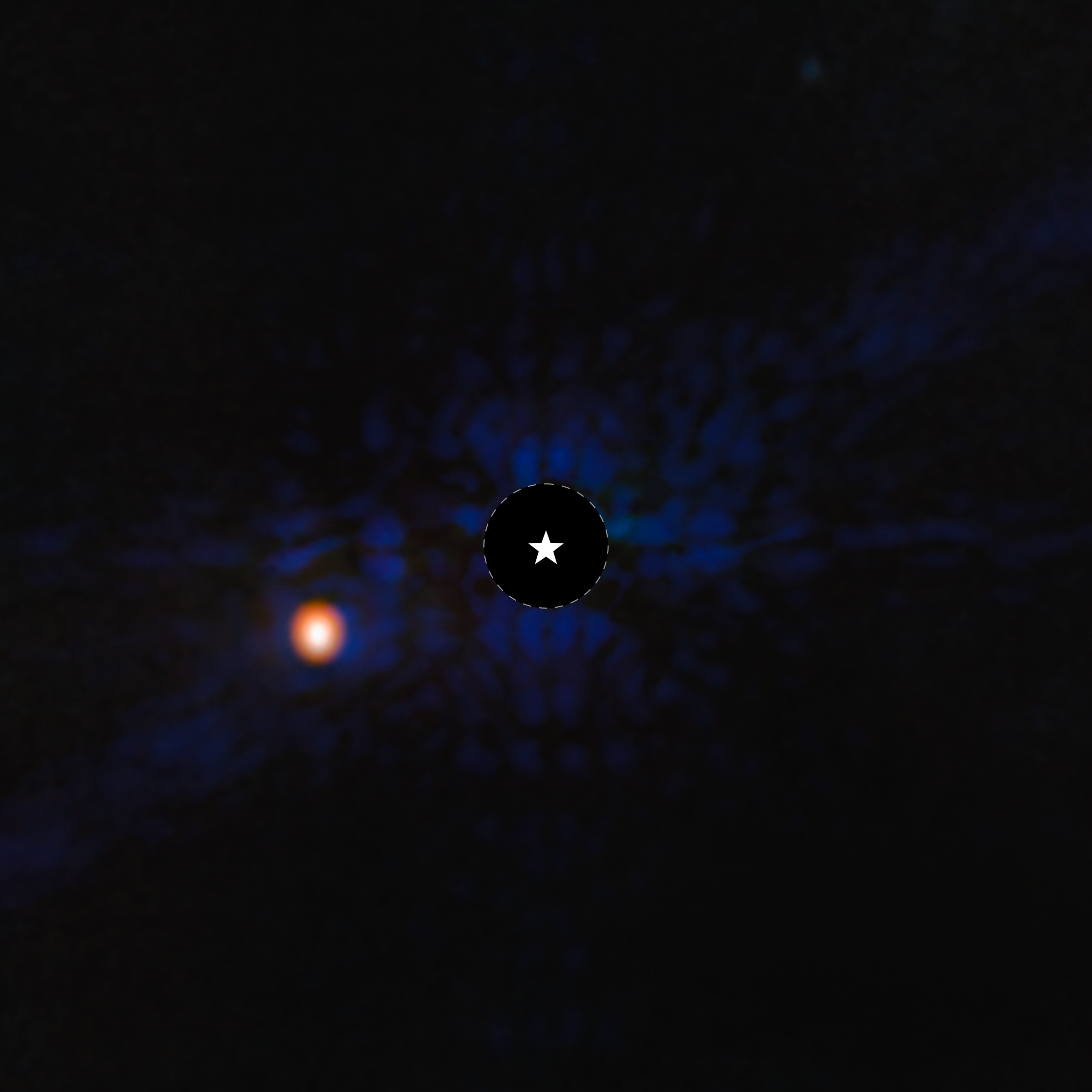
Epsilon Indi Ab imaged by JWST MIRI. The star marks the position of its host star, whose light is blocked by a coronagraph.

The existence of a planetary companion to Epsilon Indi A was suspected since 2002 based on radial velocity observations. The planet Epsilon Indi Ab was confirmed in 2018 and formally published in 2019 along with its detection via astrometry.

A direct imaging attempt of this planet using the James Webb Space Telescope was performed in 2023, and the image was released in 2024. The detected planet's mass and orbit are different from what was predicted based on radial velocity and astrometry observations. It was found to have a mass of 6.31 Jupiter masses and an elliptical orbit with a period of about 171.3 years. Later observations found the orbit to be shorter and closer to circular, with a period of 70+12
−9 to 108+49
−25 years. This difference is attributed to a more careful treatment of the data.

No excess infrared radiation that would indicate a debris disk has been detected around ε Indi. Such a debris disk could be formed from the collisions of planetesimals that survive from the early period of the star's protoplanetary disk.

== See also ==
- List of nearest stars
- List of nearest K-type stars
