= GD 165 =

Star in the constellation Boötes

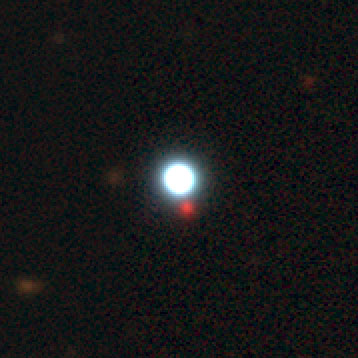
- The white dwarf GD 165 A is seen in the center of the image as a bright star. The brown dwarf GD 165 B is below the white dwarf, seen as a red spot.

Observation data Epoch J2000 Equinox J2000
- Constellation: Boötes
- Right ascension: 14^{h} 24^{m} 39.144^{s}
- Declination: 09° 17′ 13.98″

Characteristics
- Evolutionary stage: white dwarf + brown dwarf
- Spectral type: DA4+L4

Astrometry
Radial velocity (R_{v})	−26.8 ± 4.3 km/s
Proper motion (μ)	RA: −213.353 ± 0.084 mas/yr Dec.: −149.648 ± 0.074 mas/yr
Parallax (π)	29.9335±0.0559 mas
Distance	109.0 ± 0.2 ly (33.41 ± 0.06 pc)

Details

GD 165 A
Mass	0.64 ± 0.02 M_{☉}
Radius	0.0124 ± 0.0003 R_{☉}
Luminosity	0.0030 ± 0.0006 L_{☉}
Surface gravity (log g)	8.052 ± 0.035 cgs
Temperature	12,130 ± 450 K
Rotation	57.29 ± 0.34 hours
Age	1.2–5.5 Gyr

GD 165 B
Mass	62.58 ± 15.57 M_{Jup}
Radius	1.00 ± 0.08 R_{Jup}
Surface gravity (log g)	5.19 ± 0.21 cgs
Temperature	1755 ± 102 K
Age	1.2–5.5 Gyr

Other designations
- CX Boo, LSPM J1424+0917, 2MASS J14243914+0917139, WDS J14247+0917A, WD 1422+095

Database references
SIMBAD	GD 165 A
- GD 165 B

GD 165 is a binary white dwarf and brown dwarf system located in the constellation Boötes, roughly 109 light-years from Earth.

== Nomenclature and observation ==
The system GD 165 is named after Henry L. Giclas, an American Astronomer who lived throughout the 20th century.

In 1990, GD 165 A was discovered to be a variable star by Pierre Bergeron and John Thomas McGraw. It was given its variable star designation, CX Boötis, in 1993.

GD 165 B was discovered in 1988 by Eric Becklin and Benjamin Zuckerman at the University of California, Los Angeles. GD 165 B was the first dwarf discovered to be cooler than M-Type stars and was initially assigned the spectral type ≥M10. It would not be regarded as a brown dwarf until 1999, when new spectral types L-Type and T-Type for objects cooler than M-type stars were established, reclassifying GD 165 B as L4.

== Physical properties ==
GD 165 A is a pulsating white dwarf with a temperature of about 12,100 K, a mass of 0.64 M_{☉}, and a radius of 0.0124 R_{☉}.

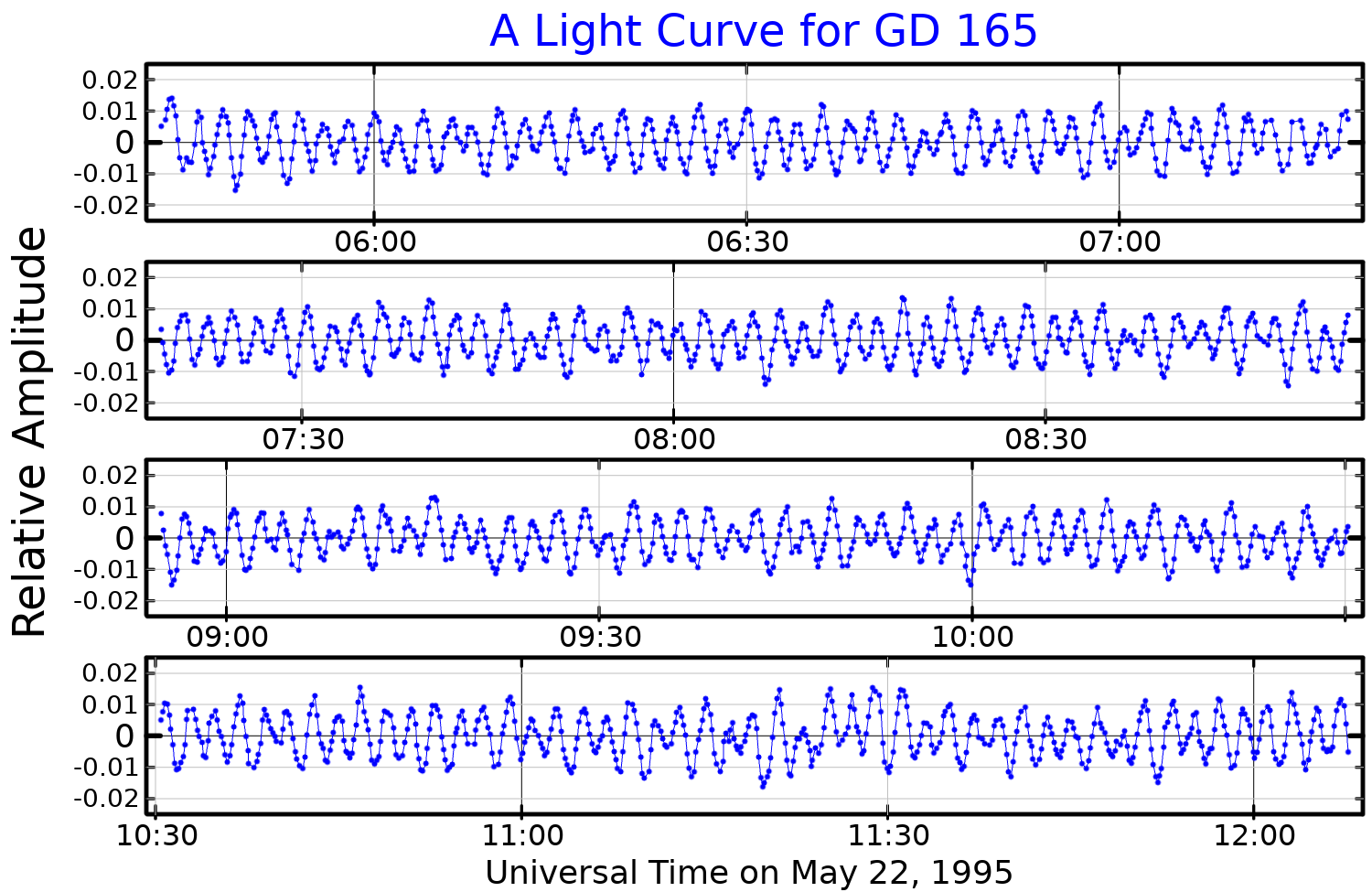
A broad band optical light curve for GD 165, adapted from Giammichele et al. (2015)

GD 165 B is an L-Type brown dwarf with a temperature of about 1,750 K, a mass of about 63 M_{J}, and a radius of 1.00 R_{J}. GD 165B is separated by 123±12 astronomical units from its host white dwarf. It is the second closest spacially resolved brown dwarf after PHL 5038, which has a separation of around 69 AU.

== See also ==
Other cooler than M brown dwarfs, discovered before 1998:

- Gliese 229 B – T6.5
- 2MASP J0345432+254023 – L0 (first isolated L-dwarf)
- DENIS-P J020529.0-115925 – L7
- DENIS-P J1058.7-1548 – L3
- DENIS-P J1228.2-1547 – L5
- Kelu-1 – L2
