= Kelu-1 =

Star in the constellation Hydra

- Location of Kelu-1 in the constellation Hydra

Observation data Epoch J2000 Equinox J2000
- Constellation: Hydra
- Right ascension: 13^{h} 05^{m} 40.196^{s}
- Declination: −25° 41′ 05.99″

Characteristics

A
- Spectral type: L2:
- Apparent magnitude (J): 13.83±0.08
- Apparent magnitude (H): 12.92±0.03
- Apparent magnitude (K_{S}): 12.32±0.02
- Apparent magnitude (L'): 11.42±0.15

B
- Spectral type: L4:
- Apparent magnitude (J): 14.65±0.12
- Apparent magnitude (H): 13.44±0.04
- Apparent magnitude (K_{S}): 12.72±0.03
- Apparent magnitude (L'): 11.66±0.15

Astrometry
Proper motion (μ)	RA: −299.2±1.2 mas/yr Dec.: −4.1±1.4 mas/yr
Parallax (π)	53.8492±0.7107 mas
Distance	60.6 ± 0.8 ly (18.6 ± 0.2 pc)

Orbit
Primary	A
Name	B
Period (P)	24.98±0.19 yr
Semi-major axis (a)	0.2279+0.9 −1.1" (4.75+0.21 −0.22 AU)
Eccentricity (e)	0.709±0.005
Inclination (i)	82.35±0.08°
Longitude of the node (Ω)	44.78±0.20°
Periastron epoch (T)	2460410+80 −110 JD
Argument of periastron (ω) (secondary)	3.7±2.1°

Details

Kelu-1 A
Mass	0.060±0.01 M_{☉}
Radius	0.098 R_{☉}
Luminosity (bolometric)	1.35–1.74×10^{−4} L_{☉}
Temperature	≈ 2,020 K
Age	0.3–0.5 Gyr

Kelu-1 B
Mass	0.055±0.01 M_{☉}
Radius	0.0976 R_{☉}
Luminosity (bolometric)	0.91–1.12×10^{−4} L_{☉}
Temperature	≈ 1,840 K
Age	0.3–0.5 Gyr

Other designations
- Kelu-1, Kelu 1, Kelu -1, LIM 1, CE 298, 2MASS J13054019-2541059, 2MASSI J1305401-2541069, DENIS-P J130540.2-254105; WISEP J130539.94-254106.1, WISE J130539.94-254106.1, V421 Hya, MUCD 11122, WDS J13057-2541AB, USNO-B1.0 0643-00289873, 2MASSW J1305402-254106

Database references
SIMBAD	Kelu-1 AB

Kelu-1 /ˈkeɪluː/ is a system of two brown dwarfs of spectral types L2 and L4 located in constellation Hydra at approximately 60.6 light-years from Earth. It is among the first free-floating later-than-M-type brown dwarfs discovered, and sometimes considered as prototype of L-type brown dwarfs.

== History of observations ==
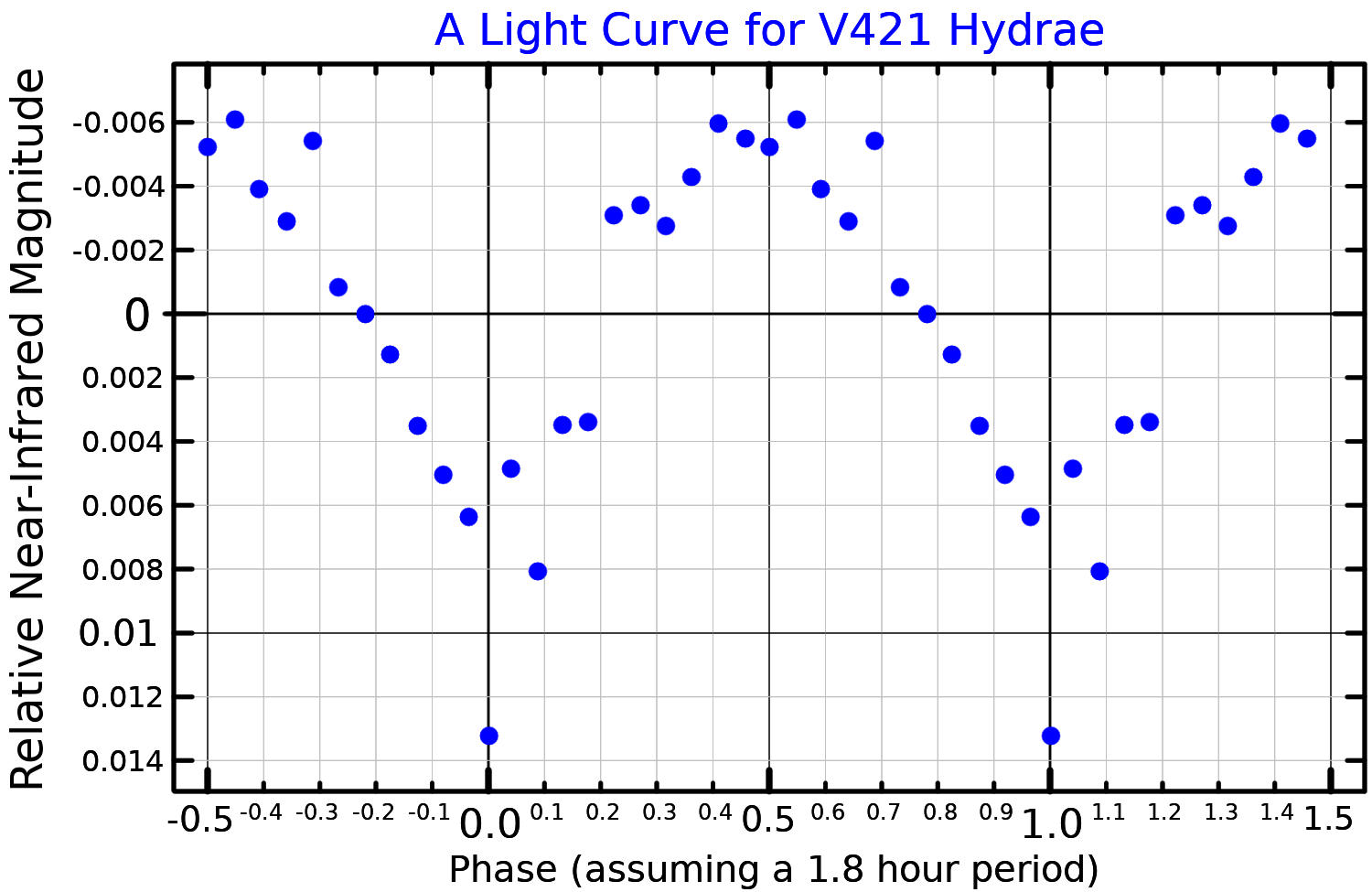
A near-infrared light curve for V421 Hydrae (Kelu-1), adapted from Clarke et al. (2002)

=== Discovery ===
In 1987 María Teresa Ruiz decided to start The Calán-ESO proper-motion survey using red plates taken (starting from the 1970s) with the 1-m ESO Schmidt Camera at La Silla Observatory, Chile. The survey was not specially designed for search for brown dwarfs, but in the main for search for another type of celestial body—white dwarfs. Pairs of plates, separated by long span of time, were compared with blink comparator to detect objects with high proper motion. Objects with high proper motion, which were found, were selected for follow-up spectroscopy using the 3.6-m telescope, equipped with EFOSC1, at the same observatory.

In March 1997 was carried out spectroscopy with the 3.6-m telescope of the next object, discovered from the pair of plates, separated by 14 years (1979–1993) (at the limit of sensitivity: its apparent magnitude in R band was about 19.5), through its large proper motion, and its spectrum was found very red, very peculiar and very odd-looking. The object's spectrum and its extremely low luminosity led to conclusion that this probably is a brown dwarf. Ruiz et al. named this brown dwarf Kelu-1: "kelu" means "red" in the Mapuche language (the origin of the second part of the name—the number 1—is unexplained in the article). (Note: This is not the only case of using Mapuche words in modern astronomy: names of four 8.2-meter VLT telescopes of Paranal Observatory (Antu, Kueyen, Melipal and Yepun) are also originated from Mapuche.)

Follow-up observations of Kelu-1 include: optical spectroscopy using the ESO 3.6 m telescope at La Silla (1997 March), infrared spectroscopy using IRCAM3 and CGS4 on UKIRT at the Mauna Kea Observatory, Hawaii (1997 April), and finding chart for Kelu-1 was kindly taken by R. Covarrubias of the Cerro Tololo Inter-American Observatory (CTIO) with the CTIO 0.9 m telescope.

The discovery paper of Kelu-1 by Ruiz et al. was received 1997 September 5, accepted for publication 1997 October 16 and published 1997 November 6 in The Astrophysical Journal Letters.

=== Inclusion to CE Catalog ===
In 2001 Ruiz et al. published The Calán-ESO Proper-Motion Catalog (CE Catalog), containing 542 high proper motion stars, detected with ESO 1-m Schmidt Camera plates taken with intervals of time between 6.4 and 16 years. Kelu-1 also was included in this catalog (as object number 298), hence one of its identifiers is CE 298.

=== Assignment of spectral class ===
Ruiz et al. did not assign any spectral class to Kelu-1—in 1997 the latest used in astronomy spectral class was M, but type of Kelu-1 was later than M. In 1999 J. Davy Kirkpatrick et al. published a paper in The Astrophysical Journal, in which they introduced two new spectral classes later than M for recently discovered cool objects—brown dwarfs: L and T. At the same time in this paper they assigned spectral classes to 26 later-than-M-type brown dwarfs, discovered by 1999: 25 brown dwarfs were assigned class L, including Kelu-1, and one, the coolest, brown dwarf Gliese 229 B was assigned class T. Kelu-1 was assigned spectral class L2 V.

=== 2nd component hypothesis ===
In 1997 Ruiz et al. had made two estimates of distance of Kelu-1—from its proper motion, assuming its observed motion is due to Solar System's motion only (about 12 parsecs), and from its apparent magnitude in J band, assuming it is same with that of GD 165 B—another L-type brown dwarf with similar spectral properties, discovered in 1988 in the system of white dwarf GD 165 (about 10 parsecs).

But in 1999 preliminary trigonometric parallax of Kelu-1, measured under USNO faint-star parallax program, was obtained, and it turned out that it is located further—at about 19 parsecs, and so it is more luminous than GD 165 B. There were two possible explanations of overluminosity of Kelu-1: it is either young (age less than 0.1 Gyr) or binary. However, observations of Kelu-1 with near-infrared camera NICMOS on Hubble Space Telescope carried out on 1998 August 14, did not reveal the presence of any companion with separation greater than 300 mas and magnitude difference less than 6.7 mag.

=== 2nd component discovery ===
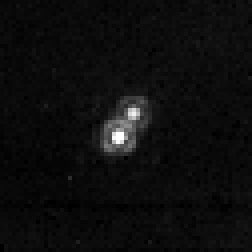
Kelu 1 with NICMOS, The A component is on the lower left.

In 2005 the binarity hypothesis proved true: the second component (Kelu-1 B) was discovered with the Laser Guide Star Adaptive Optics (LGS AO) system on 10-meter Keck II Telescope, Mauna Kea Observatory, Hawaii, by Gelino et al. and independently by Liu and Leggett.

Gelino et al.observed Kelu-1 with infrared camera NIRC2 using LGS AO system on 2005 March 4 and 2005 April 30, and it appeared to be a binary object with a separation about 290 mas. The binarity was confirmed with HST observations on 2005 July 31 by W. Brandner that were present in the public archive. HST did not detect the companion in 1998 August observations, as it turned out, because its separation increased for 1998–2005 due to orbital motion, and in 1998 it was several times smaller. However, Gelino et al. re-analyzed a 1998 HST observation of Kelu-1 and found that it is best fit by a binary object separated by 45 ± 18 mas. The discovery paper by Gelino et al. was submitted to The Publications of the Astronomical Society of the Pacific on 5 August 2005, and it was published in 2006 April.

Liu & Leggett independently observed Kelu-1 on 2005 May 1 also with NIRC2 using LGS AO system on Keck II Telescope, and also discovered the companion Kelu-1 B (a separation was 291 ± 2 mas). Despite Liu & Leggett had conducted their observations slightly later than Gelino et al., they published their discovery paper of Kelu-1 B earlier—it was received 2005 June 2, accepted for publication 2005 August 1 and published in The Astrophysical Journal 2005 November 20.

=== 3rd component hypothesis ===
In 2005–2008, Stumpf et al. observed Kelu-1 with NICMOS camera of HST and with the adaptive optics system NACO at the ESO 8.2-meter telescope VLT/UT4 (Yepun) at Paranal Observatory, Chile (they also used observations with Spitzer Space Telescope, retrieved from the SPITZER Science Archive).

They obtained orbital parameters and total mass estimate of Kelu-1 system: 177^{+113}_{−55} M_{Jup}. The mass is too high for a system of two brown dwarfs: an upper limit for brown dwarf mass is 72–75 M_{Jup}, so a maximum mass for a system of two brown dwarfs is about 150 M_{Jup}. Moreover, presence of Li absorption in the unresolved spectrum of Kelu-1 indicates that at least one of its components has mass below lithium-burning limit, which is 65 M_{Jup}.

This may indicate presence of the third component in the system. Another possible explanation of too high mass: it may be an under-prediction of the masses of brown dwarfs, which is already the case for other objects (AB Dor C, GJ 802 b and Epsilon Indi Ba, Bb).

Also Stumpf et al. revealed a peculiarity in the spectrum of Kelu-1 A, indicating it itself may be an unresolved binary with spectral types of L0.5 ± 0.5 for Kelu-1 Aa and T7.5 ± 1 for Kelu-1 Ab (corresponding to a mass of 18.5 M_{Jup}). However, a later analysis of the system's integrated spectrum by Dupuy and Liu didn't find such a feature, even though it should have been detectable.

=== X-rays and attempt of detection in radio ===
Kelu-1 system is also a source of X-rays, which was revealed in 2007 by Audard et al. using Chandra X-ray Observatory. The luminosity of Kelu-1 in X-rays is L_{X} = 2.9^{+1.8}_{−1.3} · 10^{25} erg·s^{−1}.

This was the first detection of X-rays from an L dwarf.

In the same time Audard et al. attempted to detect Kelu-1 in the radio using Very Large Array, but it remained undetected in radio.

== Distance ==
Currently the most precise distance estimate of Kelu-1 is 60.6 ± 0.8 light-years (18.58 ± 0.25 pc), measured in 2018 by the Gaia satellite via trigonometric parallax.

Kelu-1 distance estimates

Source	Parallax, mas	Distance, pc	Distance, ly	Ref.
Ruiz et al. (1997) (from proper motion)		~12	~39.1	
Ruiz et al. (1997) (spectrophotometric)		~10	~32.6	
Dahn (1999) (private communication); Ruiz (1999) (private communication)		19 ± 1	62.0 ± 3.3	
Dahn et al. (2002)	53.6±2.0	18.7±0.7	60.9±2.3	
Dupuy & Liu (2012)	49.7±2.4	20.1^{+1.0}_{−0.9}	65.6^{+3.3}_{−3.0}	
Gaia DR2 (2018)	**53.8492±0.7107**	**18.6±0.2**	**60.6±0.8**	

Non-trigonometric distance estimates are marked in italic. The best estimate is marked in bold.

== Early discoveries of brown dwarfs ==
Although Kelu-1 is among the first free-floating L dwarfs discovered, it is actually not the first. Three free-floating L dwarfs were found by Xavier Delfosse et al. using the DENIS survey (the article was submitted and published in the same 1997, but it was submitted earlier than Ruiz et al. (1997)):

- DENIS-P J020529.0-115925
- DENIS-P J1058.7-1548
- DENIS-P J1228.2-1547

And one free-floating L dwarf was announced by Kirkpatrick et al. using 2MASS prototype observations ("MASP") (the article was submitted in 1996 and published in 1997):

- 2MASP J0345432+254023

In addition, several free-floating brown dwarfs candidates have been found in the Pleiades cluster by Rebolo et al. (1996).

Two early discoveries of not free-floating L and T dwarfs:

- Gliese 229 B (a T6.5-type companion to a red dwarf, detected in 1995 by Nakajima et al.)
- GD 165 B (an L4-type companion to a white dwarf, detected in 1988 by Becklin and Zuckerman)

Furthermore, some of late M-type stars are also considered as brown dwarfs now. Such objects were known even earlier: some of them were included to the NLTT Catalogue in 1979, for example, LP 944-020.

== See also ==
- List of brown dwarfs
- 2MASS J0523-1403
- SSSPM J0829-1309
