= DENIS J082303.1−491201 =

Brown dwarf in the constellation Vela

Observation data Epoch J2000 Equinox ICRS
- Constellation: Vela
- Right ascension: 08^{h} 23^{m} 03.13^{s}
- Declination: −49° 12′ 01.3″

Characteristics
- Spectral type: L1.5 + L5.5
- Apparent magnitude (R): 20.020

Astrometry
Proper motion (μ)	RA: −154.92 mas/yr Dec.: 7.99 mas/yr
Distance	67.48 ± 0.20 ly (20.69 ± 0.06 pc)

Orbit
Period (P)	247.75 ± 0.64 d
Semi-major axis (a)	4.62 ± 0.12 mas″
Eccentricity (e)	0.36 ± 0.04
Inclination (i)	52.2 ± 1.5°
Longitude of the node (Ω)	346.2 ± 2.0°
Periastron epoch (T)	JD 2455927.323928
Argument of periastron (ω) (secondary)	41.8 ± 4.7°

Details

A
Mass	0.028−0.063 M_{☉}
Luminosity	0.00018 L_{☉}
Temperature	2150 ± 100 K
Age	80–500 Myr

B
Mass	0.018−0.045 M_{☉}
Luminosity	0.000063 L_{☉}
Temperature	1670 ± 140 K

Other designations
- 2MASS J08230313-4912012

Database references
SIMBAD	data

DENIS-P J082303.1-491201 (also known as DENIS J082303.1-491201, DE0823-49), is a binary system of two brown dwarfs, located 20.77 parsecs (67.7 ly) from Earth. The system is located in the constellation Vela.

The primary has a spectral class of L1.5, a mass of 0.028 to 0.063 M_{☉} and a temperature of 2,150 K (1,880 °C; 3,410 °F). The secondary is also a brown dwarf but with a spectral type of L5.5, a mass of 0.018 to 0.045 M_{☉}, and a temperature of 1,670 K (1,400 °C; 2,550 °F). The mass ratio is around 0.64 to 0.74.

The system has an orbital period of 248 days. The age of the system is estimated to be around 80 to 500 million years old, a relatively young object in the solar neighbourhood, however it does not seem to have any association with any moving groups.

DENIS J082303.1-491201 was discovered in 2007 by Ngoc Phan-Bao et al as part of the Deep Near Infrared Survey of the Southern Sky or DENIS for short.

== Planetary system ==
A substellar companion, DENIS-P J082303.1−491201 b was discovered in 2013 and included in the NASA Exoplanet Archive as the first exoplanet discovered by the Astrometry exoplanet detection method.
