= 2M1510 =

Star system in the constellation Libra

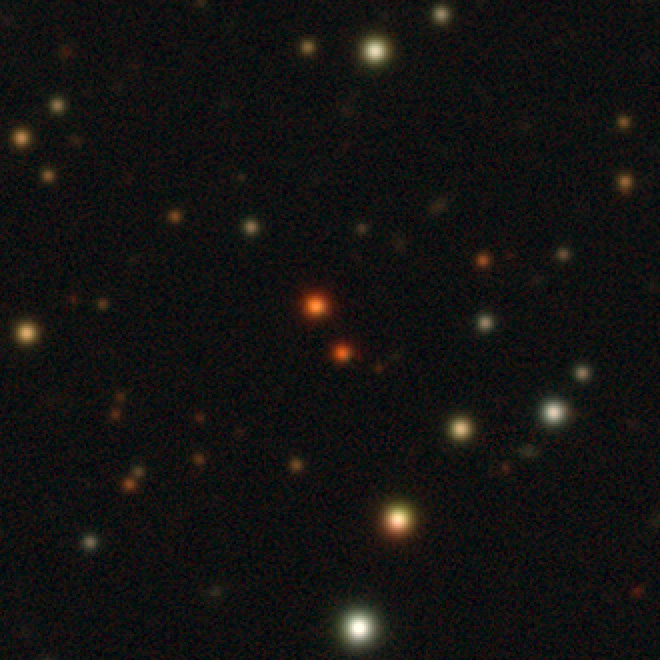
- The two red "stars" in the center of the image are 2M1510AB (upper left) and 2M1510C (lower right); Credit: Legacy Surveys / D. Lang (Perimeter Institute) & Meli thev

Observation data Epoch J2000.0 Equinox ICRS
- Constellation: Libra
- 2M1510 AB
- Right ascension: 15^{h} 10^{m} 47.86^{s}
- Declination: −28° 18′ 17.5″
- 2M1510 C
- Right ascension: 15^{h} 10^{m} 47.60^{s}
- Declination: −28° 18′ 23.4″

Characteristics

2M1510 AB
- Spectral type: M9γ + L1β(?) (near-IR)
- Apparent magnitude (G): 17.487
- Variable type: eclipsing

2M1510 C
- Spectral type: M9γ (near-IR)
- Apparent magnitude (G): 18.886

Astrometry

2M1510 AB
Radial velocity (R_{v})	-12.9 ± 0.4 km/s
Proper motion (μ)	RA: −118.747±0.492 mas/yr Dec.: −46.865±0.420 mas/yr
Parallax (π)	27.2203±0.2665 mas
Distance	120 ± 1 ly (36.7 ± 0.4 pc)

2M1510 C
Radial velocity (R_{v})	-12.0 ± 0.3 km/s
Proper motion (μ)	RA: −117.458±0.893 mas/yr Dec.: −45.713±0.746 mas/yr
Parallax (π)	27.6869±0.4939 mas
Distance	118 ± 2 ly (36.1 ± 0.6 pc)

Orbit
Period (P)	20.897782±0.000036 days
Semi-major axis (a)	0.0627±0.0014 au
Eccentricity (e)	0.309±0.022
Inclination (i)	88.466±0.030°

Details

2M1510 A
Mass	0.033101(73) M_{☉}
Mass	34.676±0.076 M_{Jup}
Radius	0.157±0.003 R_{☉}
Radius	1.530±0.055 R_{Jup}
Luminosity	0.00063±0.00001 L_{☉}
Surface gravity (log g)	4.55 cgs
Temperature	2,400 K
Rotational velocity (v sin i)	8.7±1.0 km/s
Age	45±5 Myr

2M1510 B
Mass	0.033212(69) M_{☉}
Mass	34.792±0.072 M_{Jup}
Radius	0.157±0.003 R_{☉}
Radius	1.530±0.055 R_{Jup}
Luminosity	0.00063±0.00001 L_{☉}
Surface gravity (log g)	4.55 cgs
Temperature	2,400 K
Metallicity [Fe/H]	0.0 dex
Rotational velocity (v sin i)	6.8±1.5 km/s
Age	45±5 Myr

Other designations
- 2M1510 AB, 2MASSW J1510478–281817, 2MASS J15104761–2818234, DENIS J151047.8–281817, 2MUCD 20604, TIC 61253912, Gaia DR2 6212595980928732032

Database references
SIMBAD	AB
- C

2M1510 (full designation: 2MASS J15104761–2818234) is a triple or possibly quadruple system of gravitationally bound brown dwarfs, consisting of the eclipsing binary 2M1510AB and the wide companion 2M1510C. 2M1510AB was found to be an eclipsing binary in the first light data of the SPECULOOS telescopes. It is only the second eclipsing binary brown dwarf found so far (as of March 2020), the other is 2M0535-05. The system verified theoretical models for how brown dwarfs cool. The system is located 120 light-years away from Earth in the constellation Libra.

== Nomenclature ==
Different works by different teams did give the individual brown dwarfs different names. Triaud et al. used lower cases to describe the inner eclipsing binary, which is common practice. Planets do however also use lower cases. To avoid confusion this article will use the naming used by Baycroft et al. and will call the direct imaging candidate by Calissendorff et al. with a D.

Gizis 2002	2MASSW J1510478-281817			2MASSW J1510476-281823
publication	direct imaging companion	eclipsing binary pair	exoplanet	wide companion
Calissendorff et al. 2019	2M1510B	–	–	–
Triaud et al. 2020	–	2M1510Aab	–	2M1510B
Baycroft et al. 2025	–	2M1510AB	2M1510(AB)b	2M1510C
2M1510 article	2M1510D	2M1510AB	2M1510(AB)b	2M1510C

== Age ==
2M1510AB has hydrogen-alpha emission lines, which is interpreted as a sign of youth. The system also belongs to the 45±5 million-year-old Argus moving group and the brown dwarfs have a low surface gravity, which is an additional indicator for youth.

== The brown dwarf system ==
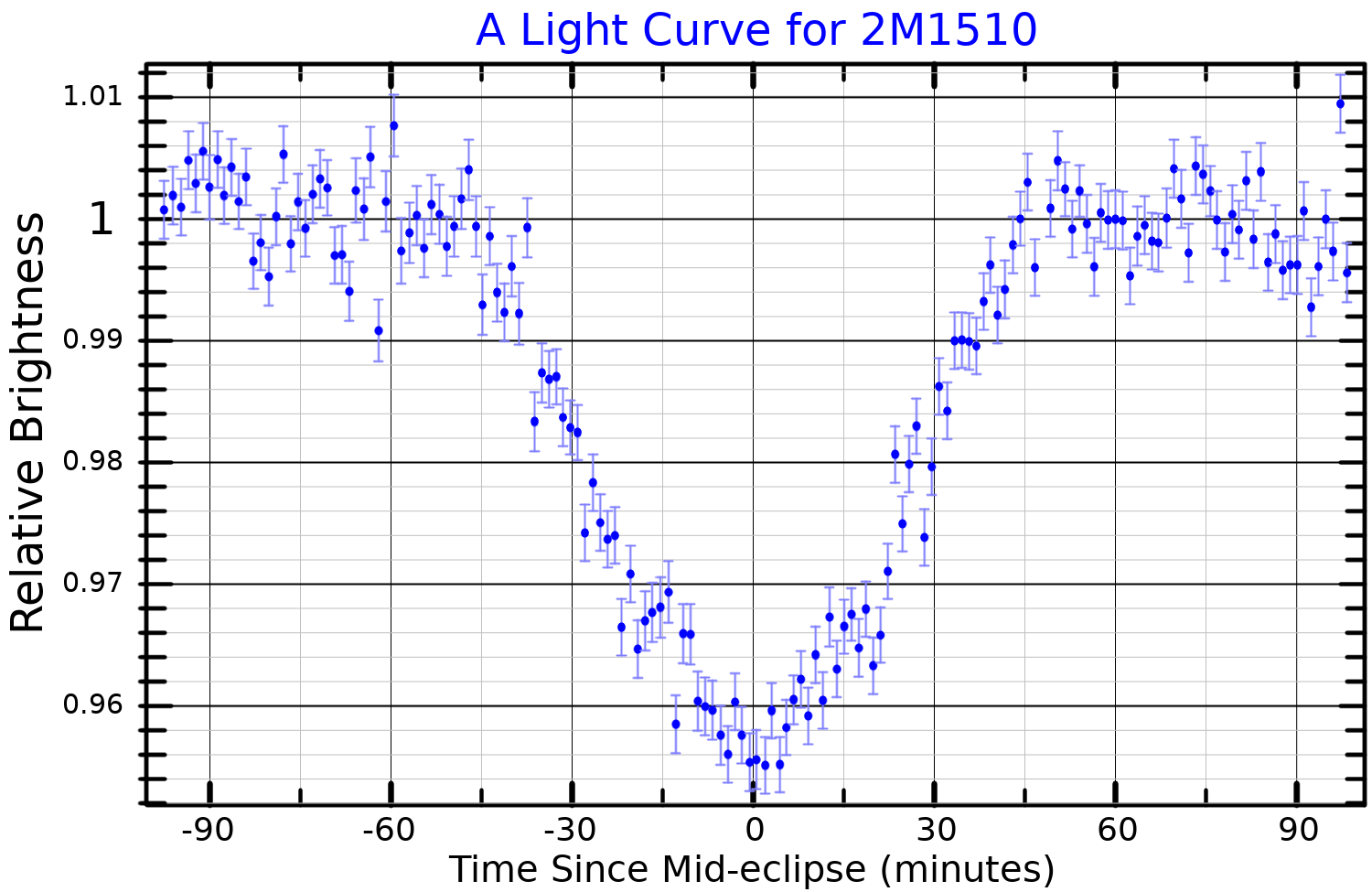
A light curve for 2M1510, adapted from Triaud et al. (2020)

2M1510AB and 2M1510C are separated by 250 astronomical units, making them a resolved binary in 2MASS data. The components of the inner eclipsing binary are called 2M1510A and 2M1510B. 2M1510AB is not only an eclipsing binary, but also a double-lined spectroscopic binary. This was discovered by follow-up observations with Keck II. Follow-up observations with Keck II and the VLT UT2 showed that 2M1510A and 2M1510B have very similar masses, something that is called a near equal-mass binary. 2M1510A has a mass of about 40 M_{J} and 2M1510B has a mass of about 39 M_{J}. The pair orbits each other every 20.9 days. Additionally the 2M1510AB source has an elongated point spread function in VLT/SINFONI data. The naming of the brown dwarfs in Calissendorff et al. 2019 does not follow other works and the companion was called 2M1510B (here from now on: 2M1510D). 2M1510D has a mass of 17.68+4.20
−2.10 M_{J} and it is separated by about 4.4 au from 2M1510AB and orbits the eclipsing binary each 30 years. This result was not considered by Triaud et al. 2020 and it could represent a contamination of the eclipsing binary, making a test of the cooling models more challenging.

The orbital period was improved with TESS, which will make follow-up observations with other telescopes possible.

== Planet candidate ==
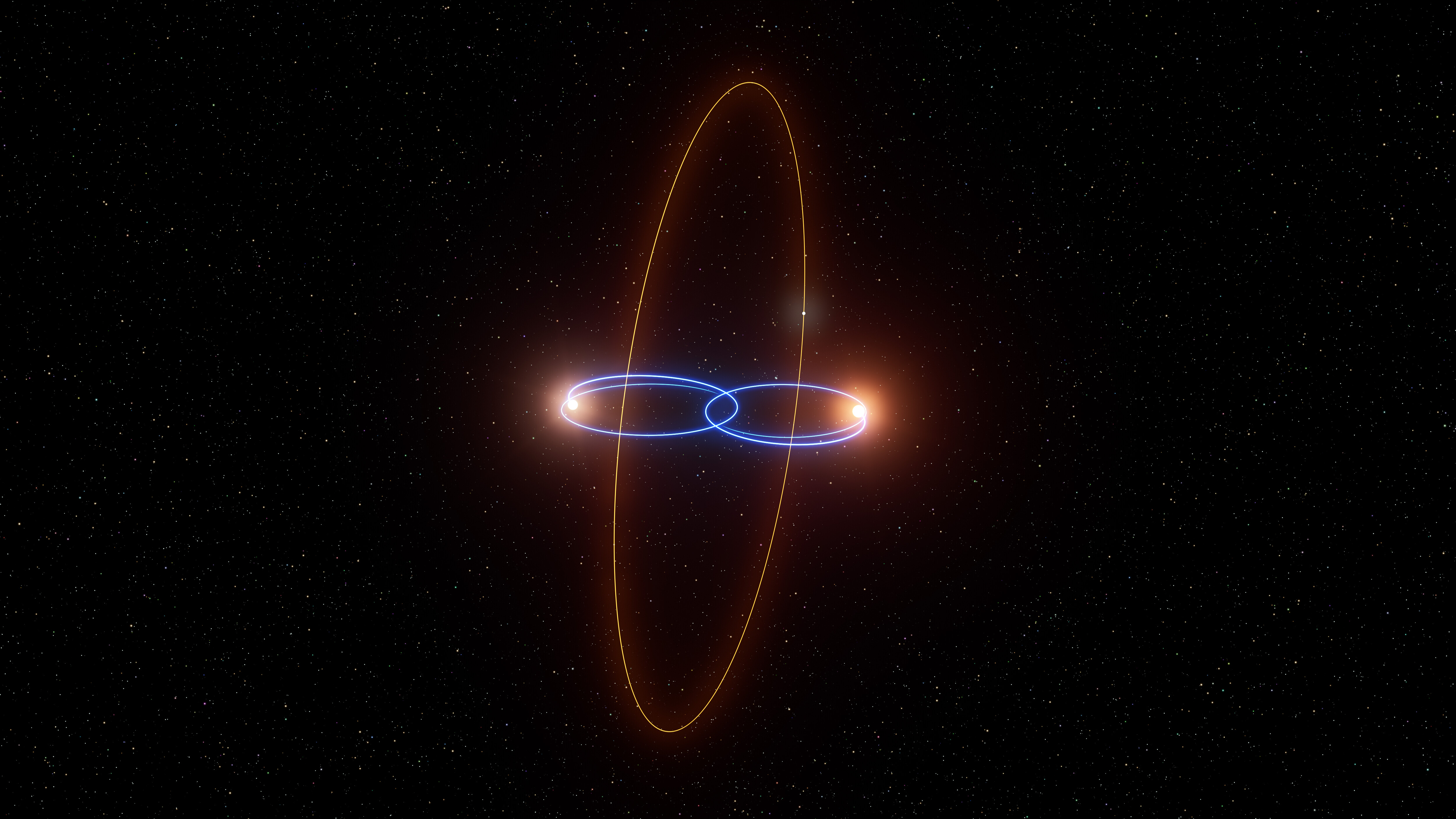
Orbit of the planet (orange orbit) around the brown dwarf binary 2M1510AB (blue orbits).

In April 2025 astronomers using ESO's UVES instrument on the Very Large Telescope announced strong evidence for a circumbinary planet orbiting the brown dwarf pair 2M1510AB. The planet is called 2M1510(AB)b, or just 2M1510b. The orbit of the planet is unusual as it is a polar orbit around a binary system, the first such case that was discovered. The discovery was made with the help of radial velocity measurements that showed retrograde apsidal precession of the brown dwarf pair, which could not be explained by the outer companion. There is currently a dependency between orbital period and mass of the planet. The planet could have an orbital period of ≈100 days for a planet mass of ≈10 M_{🜨}, but if the orbital period is instead ≈400 days, the planet mass would be ≈100 M_{🜨}. Follow-up observations are suggested, such as eclipse timing variation (ETV) or astrometry. These could confirm the planet and break the dependence between orbital period and mass of the planet. Direct imaging would not be sensitive enough to detect 2M1510b, but could detect other planets.

A study from 2025 did find that a timing offset in the Doppler data may have produced a spurious signal. They find radial velocity uncertainties are underestimated and the planet candidate may be a false positive.

The 2M1510AB planetary system (Note: Mass: Baycroft, Thomas A. 2025 Radius: J. F. Otegi 2019 Orbital related: Millward, Seb T. 2025)
Companion (in order from star)	Mass	Semimajor axis (AU)	Orbital period (days)	Eccentricity	Inclination (°)	Radius
b (unconfirmed)	0.031 M_{J} 9.853 M_{🜨}	—	20.897782 ± 0.000036	0.309	88.47±0.03°	3.44 (Note: Based on mass–radius relation) R_{🜨}

== See also ==
- List of nearby stellar associations and moving groups
- W2150AB another wide binary

other triple brown dwarf systems:

- DENIS-P J020529.0−115925
- 2MASS J08381155+1511155
- VHS J1256–1257
- 2MASS J0920+3517
