= DENIS-P J082303.1−491201 b =

Exoplanet or brown dwarf

DENIS-P J082303.1-491201 b
Discovery
- Discovered by: Sahlmann et al. (2013)
- Discovery site: ESO telescopes at the La Silla Paranal Observatory
- Discovery date: August 2013
- Detection method: Astrometry

Designations
- Alternative names: 2MASS J08230313-4912012 b

Orbital characteristics
- Semi-major axis: 0.36±0.01 AU
- Eccentricity: 0.345+0.068 −0.064
- Orbital period (sidereal): 246.36+1.38 −1.35 days
- Inclination: 56.6+1.9 −2.1 deg
- Longitude of perihelion: 36.3+7.2 −8.4 deg

Physical characteristics
- Mass: 28.5±1.9 M_{J}
- Temperature: 1670
- Spectral type: L5.5

DENIS-P J082303.1-491201 b (alias 2MASS J08230313-4912012 b) is a substellar object, classified as either an exoplanet or a brown dwarf, orbiting DENIS-P J082303.1-491201, an L1.5-type brown dwarf in the constellation Vela.

== Discovery ==
DENIS-P J082303.1-491201 b was discovered by Sahlmann et al. (2013) using the ESO telescopes at the La Silla Paranal Observatory. It is part of an ultracool binary system.

== Properties ==
It is located 20.77 parsecs (67.7 ly) from Earth. At 28.5±1.9 M_{J}, it is listed as among the most massive planets in the NASA Exoplanet Archive.

It orbits the nearby L1.5-type brown dwarf DENIS-P J082303.1-491201, which is 7.5±0.7% the mass of the Sun, and has an orbital period of about 246 days.

== See also ==
- Deep Near Infrared Survey of the Southern Sky
- DENIS-P J1058.7-1548
- DENIS-P J1228.2-1547
- DENIS-P J020529.0-115925
- DENIS-P J101807.5-285931
- List of exoplanet extremes
- List of exoplanets discovered using the Kepler spacecraft
