= 2MASSW J0920122+351742 =

2MASS J0920+3517 is a triple brown dwarf system

2MASS J0920+3517AB
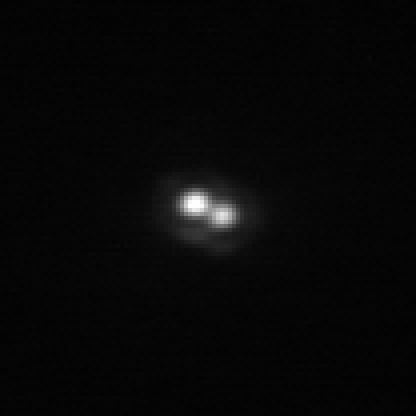
- 2MASS J0920+3517 resolved in 2007 with Keck NIRC2; Credit: Keck Observatory & Meli_thev

Observation data Epoch J2000 Equinox J2000
- Constellation: Lynx
- Right ascension: 09^{h} 20^{m} 12.237^{s}
- Declination: +35° 17′ 42.97″

Characteristics
- Evolutionary stage: brown dwarf
- Spectral type: L5.5+L9
- Apparent magnitude (J): 13.89 ±0.17
- Apparent magnitude (H): 12.92 ±0.07
- Apparent magnitude (Ks): 12.12 ±0.08

Astrometry
Proper motion (μ)	RA: -188.9 ±0.8 mas/yr Dec.: -198.5 ±0.7 mas/yr
Parallax (π)	32.3±0.6 mas
Distance	101 ± 2 ly (31.0 ± 0.6 pc)

Orbit
Primary	2MASS J0920+3517A
Secondary	2MASS J0920+3517B
Period (P)	7.258 ±0.009 yr
Semi-major axis (a)	0.069 ± 0.024" (2.11 ±0.04 AU)
Eccentricity (e)	0.180+0.006 −0.007
Inclination (i)	88.6 ±2.4°
Longitude of the node (Ω)	69.0 ±1.5°
Periastron epoch (T)	2003.43 ±1.15
Argument of periastron (ω) (secondary)	317+43 −300°

Details

2MASS J0920+3517A
Mass	71±5 M_{Jup}
Radius	0.91+0.03 −0.01 R_{Jup}
Luminosity (bolometric)	10^{−4.270 ±0.030} L_{☉}
Surface gravity (log g)	5.32+0.03 −0.04 cgs
Temperature	1621+32 −30 K

2MASS J0920+3517B
Mass	116+7 −8 M_{Jup}
Radius	0.91 ±0.04 R_{Jup}
Luminosity (bolometric)	10^{–4.340 ±0.030} L_{☉}
Surface gravity (log g)	5.24 ±0.10 cgs
Temperature	1320 ±250 K
Age	2.3+0.3 −0.4 Gyr

Other designations
- 2MASSW J0920122+351742, 2MASS J09201223+3517429, ** RED 11, SDSS J092012.17+351742.0, TIC 8765593, WDS J09202+3518AB, WISE J092012.04+351740.6

Database references
SIMBAD	data

2MASS J0920+3517 (also called 2MASSW J0920122+351742) is a triple brown dwarf system. Alternatively it is a low-mass star orbiting a pair of brown dwarfs.

== Discovery ==
2MASS J0920+3517 was first discovered in 2000 by J. Davy Kirkpatrick et al., using 2MASS photometry and Keck spectroscopy. The optical spectral type was measured to be L6.5 and the distance was estimated to be 21 parsec. Shortly after the discovery, a paper by Ian Neill Reid et al. used Hubble WFPC2 to search binary L dwarfs and found that 2MASS J0902+3517 is extended in the F814W image, but not in the F606W image, showing that it has a red companion. The pair is separated by 70 milliarcseconds. Using the available distance at the time, this translated to a separation of 1.6 astronomical units. In 2017 the dynamical mass was measured by Trent J. Dupuy and Michael C. Liu and showed that the binary is overly massive with 187±11 M_{J} and with the B component being more massive. This showed that the B component is in fact two brown dwarfs of equal masses. The A component could be either a low-mass star or a high-mass brown dwarf.

== Observations ==
Before the multiple status of 2MASS J0920+3517 was discovered, a team used the Subaru Telescope to measure the spectrum of this brown dwarf. This team found methane in the H- and K-band spectrum which is unusual for an L6.5 type dwarf. Methane is usually associated with T-dwarfs. Later a team classified the infrared spectral type as T0pec, suspecting the binary to be composed of an L- and a T-dwarf. After the binary was discovered with Hubble WFPC2, VLT and Hubble observations did not resolve the binary, likely due to the highly inclined orbit and the low separation in this part of the orbit. Keck adaptive optics observations were able to resolve the binary again. This showed that the binary was on a highly inclined orbit of 88.6 ±1.2° and had a chance of 6.8% of being an eclipsing binary. The orbital period was measured to be about 6.7 years. A team estimated the component spectral types with the help of spectral deconvolution and found the primary to have a spectral type of L5.5±1 and the secondary to have a spectral type of L9±1.5. The new dynamical mass measurement found masses of 71±5 M_{J} for 2MASS J0920+3517A and 116+7
−8 M_{J} for 2MASS J0920+3517B. This mass for component B is too large for an L9-dwarf and it was interpreted that it is composed of two components with an equal mass of 58+3
−4 M_{J}. Because the B component was never resolved, the pair must be on a tight orbit. The system age is estimated to be around 2 billion years. The binary was observed with the Spitzer Infrared Spectrograph, which covers the mid-infrared and can observe silicate absorption features. The primary was identified to have silicate-rich clouds. In this study 2MASS J020+3517 belongs to their old sample and therefore the silicates are made up of small ≤0.1μm grains made of amorphous enstatite or silicon monoxide. Another study found the most abundant condensates in the top cloud layer of the primary to be 48% iron and 52% silicates. These silicates are enstatite, fosterite, periclase and quartz.

== See also ==
Other triple brown dwarfs

- 2M0838+15
- DENIS-P J020529.0−115925
- 2M1510
- VHS J1256–1257
