= 2MASS J08381155+1511155 =

2M0838+15 is a triple brown dwarf

2M0838+15
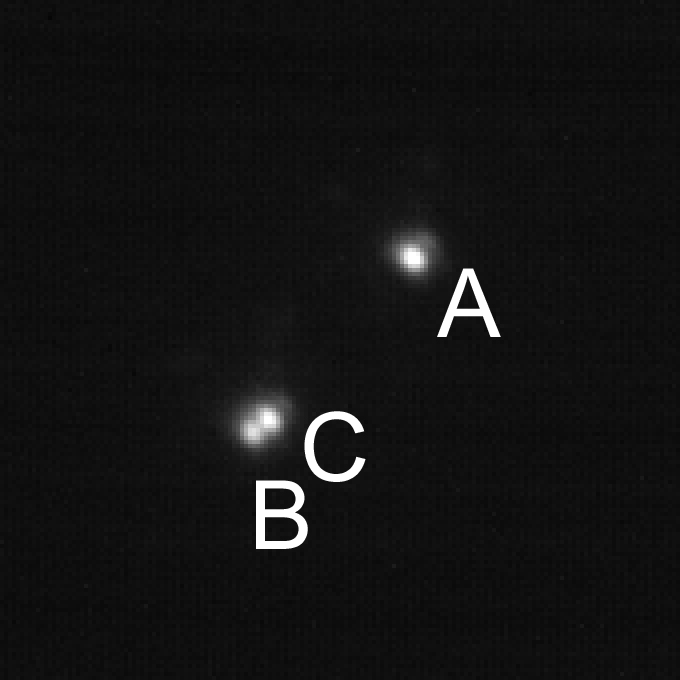
- Keck Observatory image of 2M0838+15ABC

Observation data Epoch J2000 Equinox J2000
- Constellation: Cancer
- Right ascension: 08^{h} 38^{m} 11.55^{s}
- Declination: +15° 11′ 15.51″

Characteristics
- Evolutionary stage: brown dwarf
- Spectral type: T3+T3+T4.5

Astrometry
Proper motion (μ)	RA: -139.0 ±1.9 mas/yr Dec.: 5.9 ±1.8 mas/yr
Distance	160 ±39 ly (49 ±12 pc)

Details

2M0838+15A
Mass	63 ±9 M_{Jup}

2M0838+15B
Mass	58 ±8 M_{Jup}

2M0838+15C
Mass	52 ±8 M_{Jup}

Position (relative to 2M0838+15A)
Component	2M0838+15(BC)
Epoch of observation	2010 January 8
Angular distance	549 ±1 mas
Position angle	18.8 ±0.1°
Projected separation	27 ±5 AU

Position (relative to 2M0838+15B)
Component	2M0838+15C
Epoch of observation	2010 January 8
Angular distance	50.2 ±0.5 mas
Position angle	-6 ± 2°
Projected separation	2.5 ±0.5 AU

Other designations
- 2MASS J08381155+1511155, EPIC 211646606, SDSS J083811.45+151115.5, TIC 21274825, WISEA J083811.44+151115.0, WISE J083811.44+151115.1

Database references
SIMBAD	data

2M0838+15 (also known as 2MASS J08381155+1511155) is a triple brown dwarf with all three components being T dwarfs. It was the first fully resolved triple T-type brown dwarf system that was discovered.

== Description ==
2M0838+15 was discovered in a cross-match of 2MASS and WISE as a possible T6-T7 dwarf. An unresolved spectrum with NASA IRTF was obtained. Follow-up imaging observations with Keck NIRC2 showed that this system is a triple system. Follow-up observations with Keck/OSIRIS resulted in resolved spectrum of the A and the BC components. The spectrum for component A matches a T3 ±1 spectral type. The BC spectrum matches a combined spectral type, which is composed of T3 ± 1 (B), and T4.5 ± 1 (C). Follow-up imaging showed that the triple has a common proper motion. Components BC have a relative small separation of around 2.5 AU and should have an orbital period of around 12 or 21 years. This could mean that in the future the masses can be measured for both components by using the dynamical mass method. For an age of 3 billion years the researchers estimate masses of 63+58+52 M_{J}, and for an age of 300 million years the researchers estimate masses of 21+19+17 M_{J}. The researchers find that for an age of 3 billion years the system would have a gravitational binding energy of about 20 × 10^{41} erg. This would be high enough for the system to survive a dynamical ejection from a star-forming region. For an age of 300 million years, the gravitational binding energy is about 1.6 × 10^{41} erg, which would make it a rare weakly bound triple. The researchers conclude that it is less likely that 2M0838+15 is young.

== See also ==
other triple brown dwarfs:

- DENIS-P J020529.0−115925
- 2M1510 includes eclipsing binary pair
- VHS J1256–1257
- 2MASS J0920+3517
