= PHL 5038 =

Binary system

PHL 5038AB
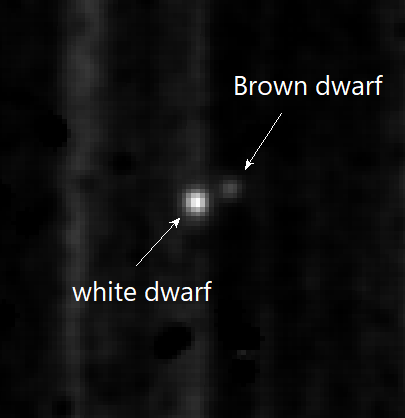
- PHL 5038AB; Credit: International Gemini Observatory

Observation data Epoch J2000 Equinox J2000
- Constellation: Aquarius
- Right ascension: 22^{h} 20^{m} 30.6964^{s}
- Declination: −00° 41′ 07.474″
- Apparent magnitude (V): 17.4

Characteristics
- Evolutionary stage: white dwarf + brown dwarf
- Spectral type: DAZ + L8-L9
- Apparent magnitude (G): 17.327±0.003
- Apparent magnitude (J): 16.745±0.017
- Apparent magnitude (H): 16.444±0.025
- Apparent magnitude (K): 16.36±0.04

Astrometry
Radial velocity (R_{v})	+52±5 km/s
Proper motion (μ)	RA: −47.771±0.111 mas/yr Dec.: −171.029±0.097 mas/yr
Parallax (π)	13.6148±0.1083 mas
Distance	240 ± 2 ly (73.4 ± 0.6 pc)

Orbit
Primary	PHL 5038A
Name	PHL 5038B
Semi-major axis (a)	66+12 −24 AU
Eccentricity (e)	<0.615
Inclination (i)	132 ±11°

Details

PHL 5038A
Mass	0.53±0.02 M_{☉}
Radius	0.0138 (Note: Derived from known mass and surface gravity of star.) R_{☉}
Surface gravity (log g)	7.89±0.02 cgs
Temperature	7,525±25 K
Age	10.26+3.09 −3.61 Gyr

PHL 5038B
Mass	73 M_{Jup}
Radius	0.80 (Note: Derived from known mass and surface gravity of object.) R_{Jup}
Surface gravity (log g)	5.454 cgs
Temperature	1425 K
Age	10.26+3.09 −3.61 Gyr

Other designations
- 2MASS J22203068−0041070, SDSS J222030.68−004107.3, WD 2217−009, WIRED J222030.69−004107.3, TIC 439847769, Gaia DR2 2677851743291189888

Database references
SIMBAD	data

PHL 5038AB (or just PHL 5038) is a binary system consisting out of a white dwarf and a brown dwarf on a wide orbit. The system is 240 light years (74 parsec) distant from earth.

The white dwarf PHL 5038A was discovered in 2006 in data from the Sloan Digital Sky Survey and the brown dwarf companion was discovered in 2009 from UKIDSS infrared excess and confirmed with Gemini North to be a spacially resolved binary. It was only the fourth known brown dwarf to orbit a white dwarf at the time. The others were GD 165B, WD 0137-349B and GD 1400B.

== Physical parameters ==
The white dwarf was first classified as a DA white dwarf, which indicates a hydrogen-dominated atmosphere without any metal pollution. A later work found weak pollution due to calcium in the atmosphere of the white dwarf thanks to XSHOOTER spectra from the Very Large Telescope. The calcium is detected as the K-line in two spectra. No infrared excess due to a disk was detected. PHL 5038A has either accreted all debris or is surrounded by a thin disk. The mass and temperature was also overestimated in the past and later works found a mass of around 0.53 to 0.57 M_{☉}, an effective temperature of around 7500 to 7800 Kelvin and a surface gravity of around 7.9 dex. The progenitor main-sequence star had a mass of around 1.07 M_{☉} and it existed for around 9 billion years until it became an AGB star and around 1 billion years ago it became a white dwarf.

The brown dwarf has a spectral type of around L8-L9. Its mass was initially estimated to be 60 M_{J}, but this mass was likely an underestimate and more recent estimates find a mass of around 0.070 M_{☉} (or 73 M_{J}) and an effective temperature of 1425 K.

The same team that discovered the metal pollution of the white dwarf also re-observed the system with Gemini North to determine the orbital parameters. The semi-major axis is 66+12
−24 astronomical units and the inclination is 132 ±11°. The eccentricity is unconstrained, but likely lower than 0.615. In the past the white dwarf was more massive, making the semi-major axis half as large at 33 AU.

== Evolution ==
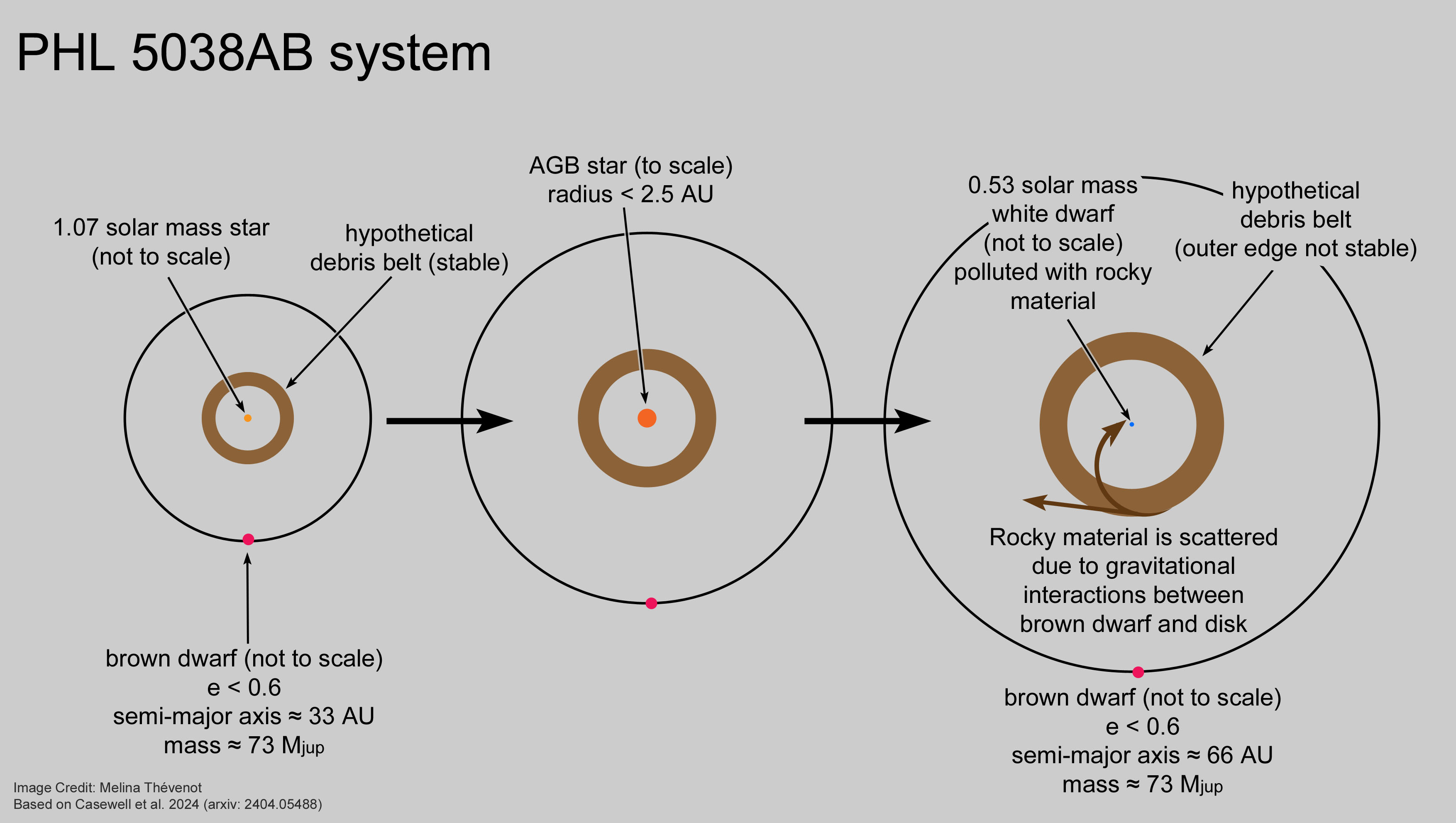
A diagram showing the evolution of PHL 5038 according to Casewell et al. 2024 (circular brown dwarf orbit)

Casewell et al. suggest the following evolution of the system:

The PHL 5038 system during the main-sequence had a star with a mass similar or more massive than the sun and it had a brown dwarf at an orbit of 33 AU, similar to the orbital distance of Neptune. It also likely had rocky debris in the form of planetesimals in orbit around the star, maybe similar to the asteroid belt. At the end of its lifetime the star became an AGB star with a size smaller than 2.5 AU, leaving the rocky debris mostly intact. As the star lost around half of its mass, the orbit of the brown dwarf and the planetesimals increased. The debris would be stable within 17-32 AU (circular orbit of the brown dwarf) or 5-8 AU (e=0.6 for the brown dwarf orbit). A debris belt with an increased size might be close to the edge of this stable zone and gravitational interactions with the brown dwarf would scatter planetesimals into all kinds of directions, eroding the edge of the debris belt. Some of these planetesimals will be scattered inwards and are being disrupted by the tidal forces of the white dwarf, leading to the pollution of the white dwarf atmosphere. Alternatively the disk could have been larger than the stable zone, resulting in chaotic scattering at the beginning of the white dwarf stage, until the scattering decreased.

== See also ==
- List of exoplanets and planetary debris around white dwarfs
- GD 165B is the first brown dwarf discovered around a white dwarf
