= LEDA 135657 =

Low surface brightness spiral galaxy in the constellation Cetus

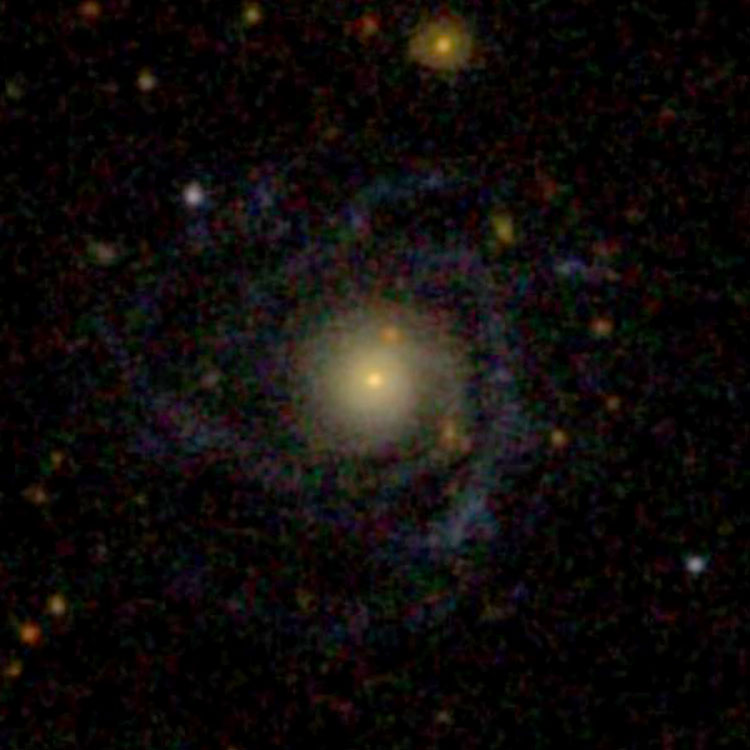
- The spiral galaxy LEDA 135657.

Observation data (J2000 epoch)
- Constellation: Cetus
- Right ascension: 02^{h} 40^{m} 11.1^{s}
- Declination: −01° 46′ 28″
- Redshift: 0.043537/13052 km/s
- Distance: 567,240,000 ly
- Apparent magnitude (V): 15.47

Characteristics
- Type: Sc
- Size: ~97,050 ly (estimated)
- Apparent size (V): 0.46' x 0.39

Other designations
- 2MASX J02401107-0146278, DENIS J024011.0-014628,6dFGS gJ024011.1-014628, ISI96 0237-0159, PGC 135657

LEDA 135657 is a distant low surface brightness spiral galaxy located about 570 million light-years away in the constellation Cetus. It has an estimated diameter of 97,000 light-years.

== See also ==
- Malin 1 a giant low surface brightness galaxy discovered in 1986
- NGC 45
- Low-surface-brightness galaxy
