= VHS J1256−1257 =

Low-mass triple star system in the constellation Corvus

VHS J125601.92−125723.9
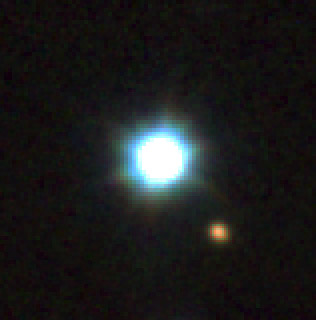
- Image of VHS 1256-1257 (center) and the b companion (lower right) in the near-infrared

Observation data Epoch J2000.0 Equinox ICRS
- Constellation: Corvus
- Right ascension: 12^{h} 56^{m} 02.1337^{s}
- Declination: −12° 57′ 21.924″
- Apparent magnitude (V): 17.759 ± 0.059

Characteristics

VHS J1256−1257AB
- Spectral type: M7.5 ± 0.5

VHS J1256−1257 b
- Spectral type: L7.0 ± 1.5
- Apparent magnitude (J): 16.662 ± 0.287
- Apparent magnitude (H): 15.595 ± 0.209
- Apparent magnitude (K): 14.568 ± 0.121

Astrometry
Radial velocity (R_{v})	−1.4 ± 4.5 km/s
Proper motion (μ)	RA: −272.462 mas/yr Dec.: −190.239 mas/yr
Parallax (π)	47.2733±0.4731 mas
Distance	69.0 ± 0.7 ly (21.2 ± 0.2 pc)

Details

VHS J1256−1257 AB
Mass	94+10 −11 M_{Jup}
Luminosity (bolometric)	0.0011±0.0002 (10^{−2.95 ± 0.07}) L_{☉}
Temperature	2620±140 K
Rotation	2.0782±0.0004 (A); 2.1342±0.0003 (B)
Rotational velocity (v sin i)	75.2+2.7 −2.3 km/s
Age	140±20 Myr

VHS J1256−1257 b
Mass	19±5 M_{Jup}
Radius	1.13–1.21 R_{Jup}
Luminosity (bolometric)	10^{−4.54 ± 0.07} L_{☉}
Surface gravity (log g)	4.55+0.15 −0.11 cgs
Temperature	1240±50 K
Rotation	22.04±0.05 h
Rotational velocity (v sin i)	13.5+3.6 −4.1 km/s
Age	140±20 Myr

Orbit
Primary	VHS J1256−1257 A
Secondary	VHS J1256−1257 B
Period (P)	7.31±0.02 yr
Semi-major axis (a)	1.96±0.03 AU
Eccentricity (e)	0.8826^{+0.0025}_{−0.0024}
Inclination (i)	118.7±1.0°
Longitude of the node (Ω)	4.4±0.5°
Periastron epoch (T)	2021.537^{+0.015}_{−0.014}
Argument of periastron (ω) (secondary)	44.9±1.0°

Position (relative to VHS J1256−1257AB)
Component	VHS J1256−1257 b
Epoch of observation	MJD 55743.067635 (1 July 2011)
Angular distance	8.06 ± 0.03″
Position angle	218.1 ± 0.2°
Projected separation	102 ± 9 AU

Other designations
- VHS J1256−1257AB: GJ 11870(A),11871(B),2MASS J12560215−1257217, TIC 2470992, SIPS J1256−1257, WDS J12560-1257A, WISE J125601.94−125723.7
- VHS J1256−1257 b: GJ 11869, 2MASS J12560183−1257276, TIC 2470993, WDS J12560-1257B, WISEA J125601.66−125728.7

Database references
SIMBAD	data
Exoplanet Archive	data

VHS J125601.92−125723.9 (abbreviated to VHS J1256−1257) is a young triple brown dwarf system located in the constellation Corvus approximately 69.0 light-years (21.2 parsecs) from the Sun. The system consists of the equal-mass binary VHS J1256−1257AB and the distant planetary-mass companion VHS 1256−1257 b. In 2022, a continuous radio emission from the radiation belts surrounding VHS J1256−1257 was detected.

== VHS J1256−1257 b ==
VHS 1256−1257 b was first identified and documented by the 2MASS survey in 2015. It orbits at a distance of 350+150
−150 AU and has an estimated mass of approximately 19±5 Jupiter masses.

The planet is carbon-rich, with a C/O molar ratio exceeding 0.63, and its temperature has been measured at 1380±54 K. VHS 1256-1257 b's rotation period has been measured to be 22.04 ± 0.05 hours, which is unusually long for substellar objects. It has a high axial tilt, similar to that of Uranus.

=== Variability ===
Observations with Hubble Wide-Field Camera 3 near-infrared time-series spectroscopic observations showed that VHS 1256 b varied with 19.3% at 1.1 and 1.7 μm over 8.5 hours. With the 1.27 μm filter the amplitude was even higher at 24.7%. This is the largest amplitude for any substellar object as of 2022, with high variability in the near-infrared and a few percent variability in the mid-infrared. Later studies with the Hubble space telescope have yielded even higher brightness variability of 33-37% without a definite period, indicating a presence of both spots and waves.

One study used the variability and spectra from JWST to conclude that planetary-scale dust storms are the main cause of the variability. These storms persist for tens of days, with large patchy clouds propagating with equatorial waves. The dust storms consist of iron and silicate particles. The model can explain the spectra and features in the light curve. It can also explain the high amplitude in near-infrared and low amplitude in mid-infrared, which cannot be explained with features seen on Jupiter.

=== Atmospheric composition ===
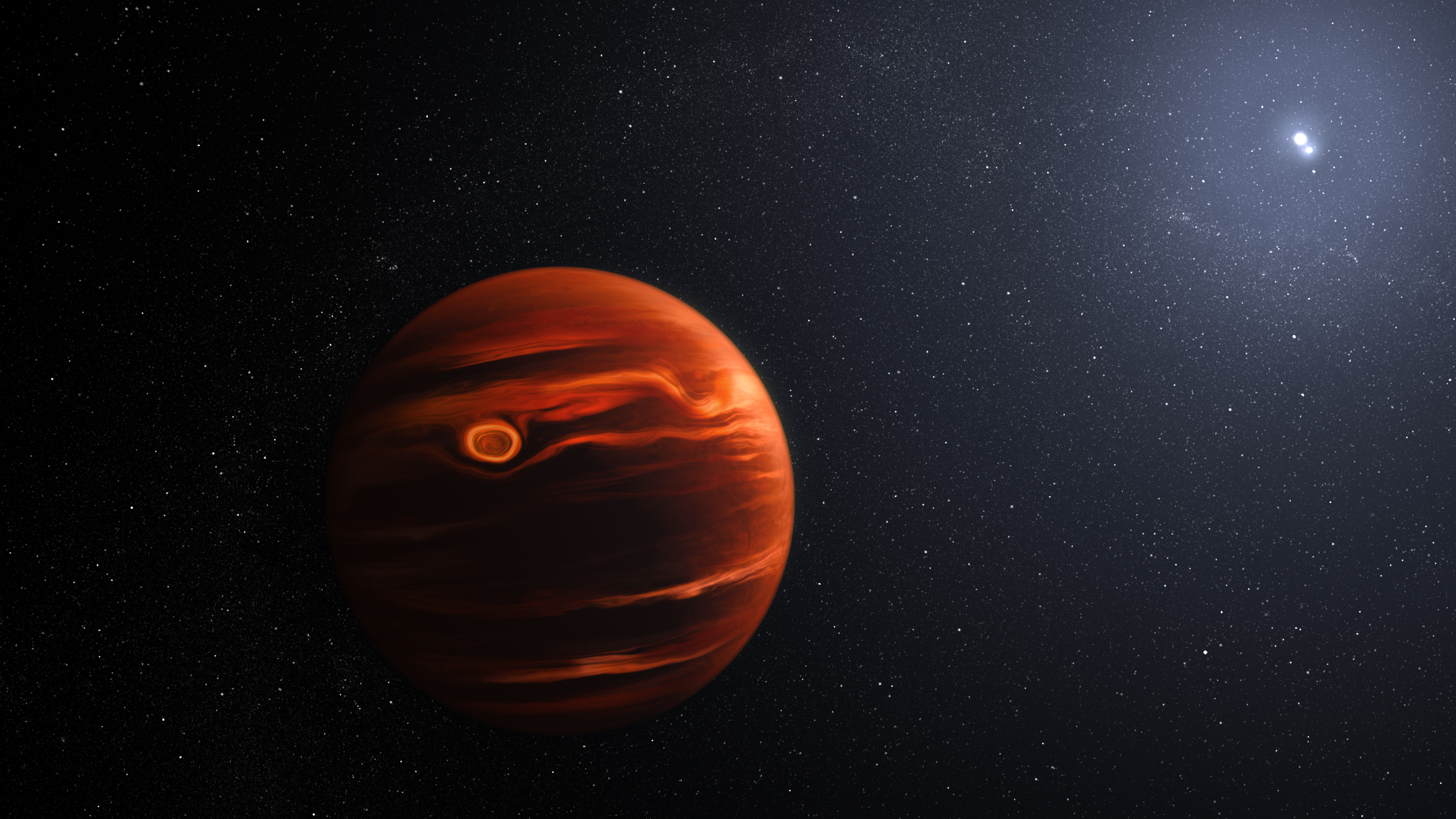
Artist's impression of VHS 1256 b in orbit around its host stars VHS J1256−1257AB, based on spectrum made by the James Webb Space Telescope

The atmosphere of VHS 1256 b is in a chemical disequilibrium. Carbon monoxide naturally reacts with hydrogen molecules in the atmosphere of brown dwarfs, forming methane and water molecules. The reaction works in both ways, meaning that methane reacts with water and releases hydrogen and carbon monoxide. At higher temperatures and lower pressure the reaction is tilted towards carbon monoxide and at lower temperatures and higher pressure the reaction is tilted towards methane. At equilibrium a cold brown dwarf or planet should have a high concentration of methane and a low concentration of carbon monoxide. The presence of carbon monoxide and depleted methane in the spectrum of VHS 1256 b compared to equilibrium atmospheric models suggests atmospheric mixing. The vertical mixing causes carbon monoxide to rise from lower and hotter atmospheric layers and methane to sink into these lower layers, forcing the upper atmosphere in chemical disequilibrium.

Water and carbon monoxide have both been detected in the atmosphere. The JWST observed the planet in 2022 by taking spectra at a wavelength of 1-20 μm with the instruments NIRSpec and MIRI. The team analysing the data found water vapor, methane, carbon monoxide, carbon dioxide, sodium, potassium and silicate clouds within the atmosphere of VHS 1256 b. The direct detection of silicate clouds is the first such detection reported for a planetary-mass object. The silicates are thought to be made of small amorphous silicate particles. The silicate feature in VHS 1256 b closely matches the silicate feature in the L4.5 brown dwarf 2M2224-0158, detected with Spitzer. The grain size and composition of the silicate clouds in VHS 1256 b will be modelled in the future.

Observations with NIRSpec detected several molecules, as well as several carbon and oxygen isotopes in the atmosphere of VHS 1256 b. The carbon-12 to carbon-13 ratio was measured as 62±2, which is in between that of isolated brown dwarfs (about 100) and that of exoplanets (about 30). Oxygen-17 and oxygen-18 abundances are higher than in the Solar System and the local interstellar medium. Isotope abundances are an important tracer of planet formation. The enhancement of minor isotopes in VHS 1256 b could by explained by isotope fractionation in protoplanetary disks. These fractionation processes could be isotope selective photodissociation, gas/ice partitioning and isotopic exchange reactions.

The VHS J1256−1257 planetary system
Companion (in order from star)	Mass	Semimajor axis (AU)	Orbital period (years)	Eccentricity	Inclination (°)	Radius
b	12.0±0.1 or 16±1 M_{J}	360^{+110}_{−150}	17000^{+8000}_{−11000}	0.73^{+0.09}_{−0.10}	26^{+12}_{−16}	1.30 or 1.22 R_{J}

== See also ==
- List of exoplanets discovered in 2015 - VHS J1256-1257 b

other triple brown dwarfs:

- 2MASS J08381155+1511155
- DENIS-P J020529.0−115925
- 2M1510
- 2MASS J0920+3517
