= María Teresa Ruiz =

Chilean astronomer

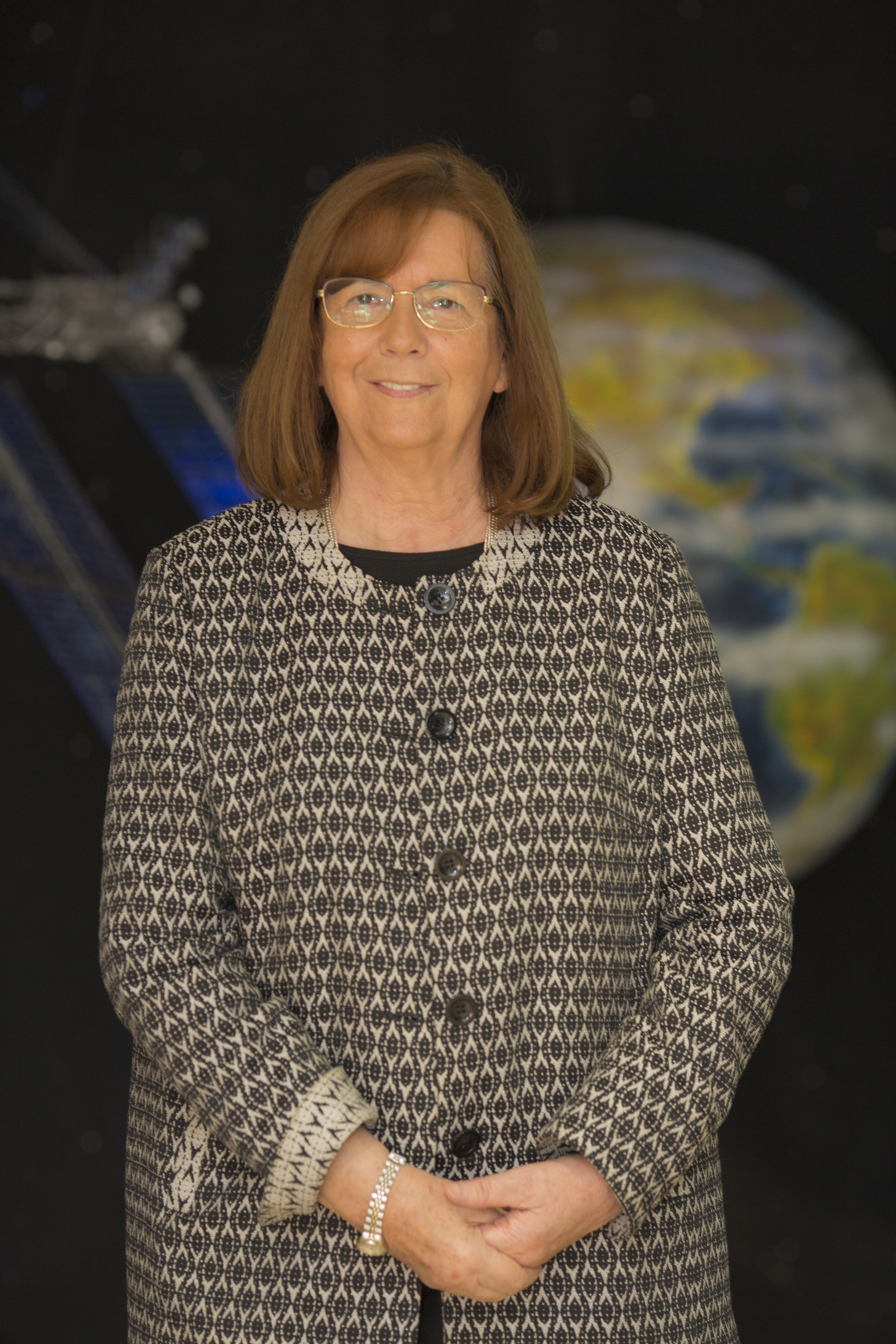
- María Teresa Ruiz in 2018
- Born: 24 September 1946 (age 80); Santiago de Chile
- Occupations: Director of the Center for Excellence in Astrophysics and Associated Technologies. Professor at Universidad de Chile Department of Astronomy.
- Known for: Discovering Kelu-1
- Partner: Fernando Lund

María Teresa Ruiz (born 24 September 1946) is a Chilean astronomer who was the first woman to receive Chile's National Prize for Exact Sciences, the first female recipient of a doctorate in astrophysics at Princeton University, and the first woman president of the Chilean Academy of Sciences. She is also known for the discovery of the brown dwarf Kelu-1.

In 2018, she was listed as one of the top 10 most powerful and influential women in Chile owing to her scientific contributions.

During her career she has written two books about astronomy: Desde Chile un cielo estrellado: lecturas para fascinarse con la astronomía (2013) and Hijos de las Estrellas (2017).

== Early life and education ==
Ruiz was born in Santiago de Chile in 1946. In 1966, Ruiz started a program in chemical engineering at the University of Chile but found her vocation in attending an astronomy summer school: she continued her studies in the newly founded astronomy program at the University of Chile and was the first person to graduate the program, in 1971.

== Career and research ==
In 1975, upon completing her thesis work with Martin Schwarzschild, Ruiz became the first woman to obtain a PhD in astrophysics at Princeton University.

In 1997 she became the first woman in Chile's history to receive the country's National Prize for Exact Sciences. She held a postdoctoral research position at Trieste Observatory and worked for two years at UNAM, the Institute of Astronomy in Mexico.

=== Astronomic discovery ===
In 1997, Ruiz discovered Kelu-1 which is a binary system of two brown dwarfs. Kelu-1 is also among the first systems of free floating brown dwarfs. This system is located in the constellation Hydra and sits approximately about 61 light years from planet Earth. Ruiz was surprised at the unusual properties of the spectrum she detected which did not look like the typical stellar spectra she was used to seeing. The spectrum of Kelu-1 contained lithium and the system had an extremely red color. These two properties led Ruiz to conclude that Kelu-1 must be a brown dwarf—one of the first free-floating ones discovered.

The name Kelu comes from the language Mapuche and it means “red”, in reference to the color of the star.

=== Overview of positions ===
- Between 1975 and 1976 she worked as a post-doctoral researcher in the Astronomical Observatory of Trieste, Italy.
- From 1977 until 1978, she was a visiting researcher at the Institute of Astronomy of the UNAM (National Autonomous University of Mexico).
- In 1978, she was a visiting researcher at the Goddard Institute for Space Studies (GISS) NASA.
- From 1979 until 1989, she taught in the Department of Astronomy of Universidad de Chile. Here, she started as an associate professor and later on obtained a tenured post.
- Since 1992 she is a member of the Association of Universities for Research in Astronomy (AURA) representing the Universidad de Chile.
- In 1993 Ruiz was a member of the Review Committee of the Instituto de Astronomia in the Universidade de São Paulo, Brazil. (Astronomy Department in the University of São Paulo)
- In 1995 she joined the Comité de Búsqueda para Project Scientist del Proyecto Gemini. (English: Project Scientist Research Party of Project Gemini.)
- In 1996 the Chilean government named her vice president of the Users Committee of the European Southern Observatory.
- Between 2001 and 2005 she was the chairwoman of the Astronomy Department.
- In 2015 she was elected as the president of the Chilean Academy of Science.
- As of 2019, she is professor at Universidad de Chile Department of Astronomy (DAS), and director of the Center for Excellence in Astrophysics and Associated Technologies (CATA).

== Selected works ==
- Desde Chile un cielo estrellado: lecturas para fascinarse con la astronomía (2013)
- Hijos de las estrellas (2017)

== Awards and honors ==
- Honors Carnegie-Chile Fellowship, 1971–1975.
- Honors MacArthur Foundation-AAAS Starter Grant, 1993.
- Presidential Chair in Science, 1996.
- Chancellor's Medal, University of Chile, 1996.
- National Prize for Exact Sciences, 1997.
- Chancellor's Medal, University of Chile, 1998.
- Fellow of the Academy of Sciences, 1998.
- Labarca Merit Award, 2000.
- Scholarship Guggenheim, 2001.
- L'Oréal-UNESCO Awards for Women in Science, 2017.
- She was recognized as one of the BBC's 100 women of 2017.
- Legion of Honour, Chevalier class (Knight)

== Personal life ==
Ruiz' hobby is embroidery. She is capable of embroidering whole portraits of people and families, such as her own. She started the hobby when she went to study abroad: she wanted to remember her family, so she embroidered a family portrait to bring her loved ones with her.

She is married to the Chilean scientist and professor Fernando Lund. In 1980, they had a son named Camilo who is now a civil engineer.

== See also ==
- Timeline of women in science
