= DENIS-P J1228.2−1547 =

Brown dwarf binary

DENIS-P J1228.2-1547
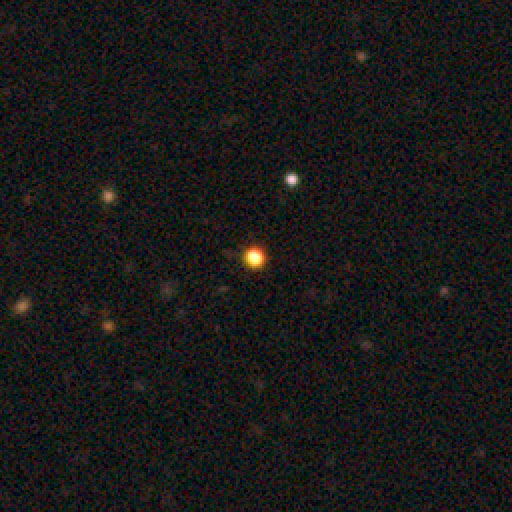
- DENIS-P J1228.2−1547; Credit: legacy surveys

Observation data Epoch J2000 Equinox ICRS
- Constellation: Corvus
- Right ascension: 12^{h} 28^{m} 15.232^{s}
- Declination: −15° 47′ 34.23″

Characteristics
- Spectral type: L5.5
- Apparent magnitude (J): 14.378
- Apparent magnitude (H): 13.35
- Apparent magnitude (K): 12.767

Astrometry
Parallax (π)	49.40±1.90 mas
Distance	66 ± 3 ly (20.2 ± 0.8 pc)

Other designations
- DENIS J1228.2-1547, 2MASS J12281523-1547342, 2MUCD 11073

Database references
SIMBAD	data

DENIS-P J1228.2-1547 is a system of two nearly equal brown dwarfs, both are of spectral types L5.5:, located in constellation Corvus at approximately 20.2 parsecs or 66.0 light-years from Earth.

== History of observations ==
DENIS-P J1228.2-1547 was one on the first free-floating L dwarfs discovered. It was discovered in 1997 by Xavier Delfosse and colleagues from the DENIS survey.

The second component (B) was discovered by Eduardo L. Martín and colleagues using near-infrared camera NICMOS on Hubble Space Telescope. It was announced in 1999.

== See also ==
The other two free-floating L dwarfs, detected by Delfosse et al. and announced in 1997:

- Deep Near Infrared Survey of the Southern Sky
- DENIS-P J1058.7-1548
- DENIS-P J020529.0-115925
- DENIS-P J082303.1-491201 b
- DENIS-P J101807.5-285931

A free-floating L dwarf, detected by Kirkpatrick et al., announced also in 1997, but earlier:

- 2MASP J0345432+254023

A free-floating L dwarf, detected by Ruiz et al., announced also in 1997, but later:

- Kelu-1
