= DENIS-P J020529.0−115925 =

Multiple star in the constellation Cetus

DENIS-P J020529.0−115925A
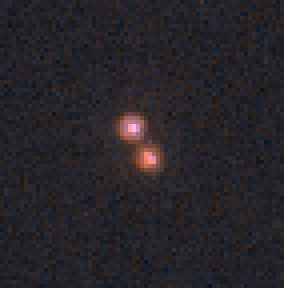
- DENIS-P J020529.0−115925 system with Hubble, the primary A is on the upper left Credit: Hubble Space Telescope

Observation data Epoch J2000 Equinox ICRS
- Constellation: Cetus
- Right ascension: 02^{h} 05^{m} 29.401^{s}
- Declination: −11° 59′ 29.67″

Characteristics
- Spectral type: L5.5 + L8 + T0
- Apparent magnitude (J): 14.587

Astrometry
Proper motion (μ)	RA: 427 mas/yr Dec.: 52 mas/yr
Parallax (π)	50.60±1.50 mas
Distance	64 ± 2 ly (19.8 ± 0.6 pc)

Other designations
- WDS J02055−1159AB, 2MASS J02052940−1159296

Database references
SIMBAD	data

DENIS-P J020529.0−115925 is a brown dwarf system in the constellation of Cetus. It is located 64 light-years (19.8 parsecs) away, based on the system's parallax. It was first found in the Deep Near Infrared Survey of the Southern Sky.

This is a triple brown dwarf system: objects that do not have enough mass to fuse hydrogen like stars. The two brightest components, designated A and B respectively, are both L-type objects. As of 2003, the two were separated 0.287° along a position angle of 246°.

Component B was observed as elongated, suggesting a third component. This third component, named C, is a T-type object. It is separated about 1.9 astronomical units (au) from B, and based on a total mass of 0.1 M_{☉}, the two may orbit each other every 8 years.

== See also ==
- DENIS-P J1058.7−1548
- DENIS-P J1228.2−1547
- DENIS-P J082303.1−491201 b
- DENIS-P J101807.5−285931

other triple brown dwarfs:

- 2M1510
- 2MASS J08381155+1511155
- VHS J1256–1257
- 2MASS J0920+3517
