= DENIS-P J1058.7−1548 =

Brown dwarf star in the constellation Crater

DENIS-P J1058.7-1548
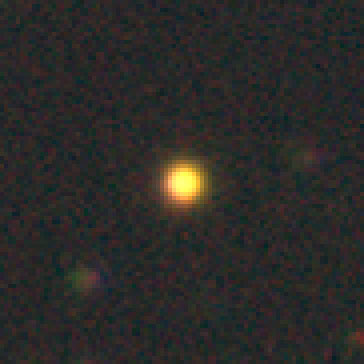
- DENIS-P J1058.7−1548; Credit: legacy surveys

Observation data Epoch J2000 Equinox J2000
- Constellation: Crater
- Right ascension: 10^{h} 58^{m} 47.870^{s}
- Declination: −15° 48′ 17.23″

Characteristics
- Spectral type: L3
- Apparent magnitude (J): 14.155
- Apparent magnitude (H): 13.226
- Apparent magnitude (K): 12.532

Astrometry
Parallax (π)	66.5±4.4 mas
Distance	49 ± 3 ly (15.0 ± 1.0 pc)

Details
Mass	<0.055 M_{☉}
Radius	1.00±0.07 R_{Jup}
Temperature	1850±150 K
Rotation	4.1±0.2 hours
Rotational velocity (v sin i)	37.5±2.5 km/s
Age	<320 Myr

Other designations
- DENIS J1058.7-1548, 2MASS J10584787-1548172, 2MUCD 10949

Database references
SIMBAD	data

DENIS-P J1058.7-1548 is a brown dwarf of spectral type L3, located in constellation Crater at approximately 17.3 parsecs or 56.5 light-years from Earth. Its spectrum was used as a standard to define the spectral class L3 back in 1997. With a surface temperature of between 1700 and 2000 K, it is cool enough for clouds to form. Variations in its brightness in visible and infrared spectra suggest it has some form of atmospheric cloud cover.

== See also ==
- Deep Near Infrared Survey of the Southern Sky
- DENIS-P J1228.2-1547
- DENIS-P J020529.0-115925
- DENIS-P J082303.1-491201 b
- DENIS-P J101807.5-285931
