= Deep Near Infrared Survey of the Southern Sky =

Astronomical survey

- Alternative names: DENIS

The Deep Near Infrared Survey of the Southern Sky (DENIS) was a deep astronomical survey of the southern sky in the near-infrared and optical wavelengths, using an ESO 1-metre telescope at the La Silla Observatory. It operated from 1996 to 2001.

== See also ==
- DENIS-P J1058.7-1548
- DENIS-P J1228.2-1547
- DENIS-P J020529.0-115925
- DENIS-P J082303.1-491201 b
- DENIS-P J101807.5-285931
- DENIS J024011.0-014628,6dFGS gJ024011.1-014628
- Edinburgh-Cape Blue Object Survey
