= HR 4049 =

Protoplanetary nebula in the constellation Antlia

- Location of HR 4049 (circled in red)

Observation data Epoch J2000.0 Equinox ICRS
- Constellation: Antlia
- Right ascension: 10^{h} 18^{m} 07.59^{s}
- Declination: −28° 59′ 31.2″
- Apparent magnitude (V): 5.29 – 5.83

Characteristics
- Evolutionary stage: Post-AGB + main sequence
- Spectral type: B9.5Ib-II
- B−V color index: +0.24
- Variable type: unique

Astrometry
Radial velocity (R_{v})	−30.12±0.09 km/s
Proper motion (μ)	RA: −16.290 mas/yr Dec.: +10.720 mas/yr
Parallax (π)	0.7107±0.0984 mas
Distance	approx. 4,600 ly (approx. 1,400 pc)

Orbit
Period (P)	428.474±0.002 days
Eccentricity (e)	0.29±0.01
Inclination (i)	60–75°
Periastron epoch (T)	2,458,383.2±0.6 HJD
Argument of periastron (ω) (secondary)	242.3±0.3°
Semi-amplitude (K_{1}) (primary)	15.52±0.13 km/s

Details

A
Mass	0.75±0.05 M_{☉}
Radius	76 ± 11 (Note: Calculated, using the Stefan-Boltzmann law and the star's effective temperature and luminosity, with respect to the solar nominal effective temperature of 5,772 K: $$\sqrt{\biggl(\frac{5,772}{7,500}\biggr)^4 \cdot 10^{4.22}} = 76\ R_\odot.$$) R_{☉}
Luminosity	16,600+5,300 −4,000 L_{☉}
Surface gravity (log g)	+1.0±0.5 cgs
Temperature	7,500±500 K
Metallicity [Fe/H]	−4.5 dex

B
Mass	0.70–0.82 M_{☉}
Radius	0.6 R_{☉}
Luminosity	0.06 L_{☉}
Surface gravity (log g)	4.6 cgs
Temperature	3,500 K

Other designations
- AG Antliae, CD−28°8070, 2MASS J10180758-2859308, GSC 06630-01759, HD 89353, FK5 1265, PPM 257470, HIP 50456, SAO 178644, HR 4049

Database references
SIMBAD	data

HR 4049, also known as HD 89353 and AG Antliae, is a binary post-asymptotic-giant-branch (post-AGB) star in the constellation Antlia. A very metal-poor star, it is surrounded by a thick unique circumbinary disk enriched in several molecules. With an apparent magnitude of about 5.5, the star can readily be seen with the naked eye under ideal conditions. It is located approximately 1,400 parsecs (4,600 ly) distant.

== Characteristics ==
HR 4049 has a peculiar spectrum. The star appears, based on its spectrum in the Balmer series, to be a blue supergiant, although in reality it is an old low-mass star on the post-AGB phase of its life. Its atmosphere is extremely deficient in heavy elements, over with a metallicity over 30,000 lower than the Sun. It also shows a strong infrared excess, corresponding closely to a 1,200 K blackbody produced by a disk of material surrounding the star. The star is also undergoing intense mass-loss Its companion has only been detected from variations in the doppler shift of its spectral lines. It is thought to be a low luminosity main sequence star.

Although HR 4049 A apparently has the spectrum of a blue supergiant, it is an old low-mass star which has exhausted nuclear fusion and is losing its outer layers as it transitions towards a white dwarf and possibly a planetary nebula. During this phase it has a luminosity several thousand times that of the Sun, although a mass around half that of the Sun. The mass can only be guessed from the expected mass of the white dwarf that it is becoming.

== Variability ==
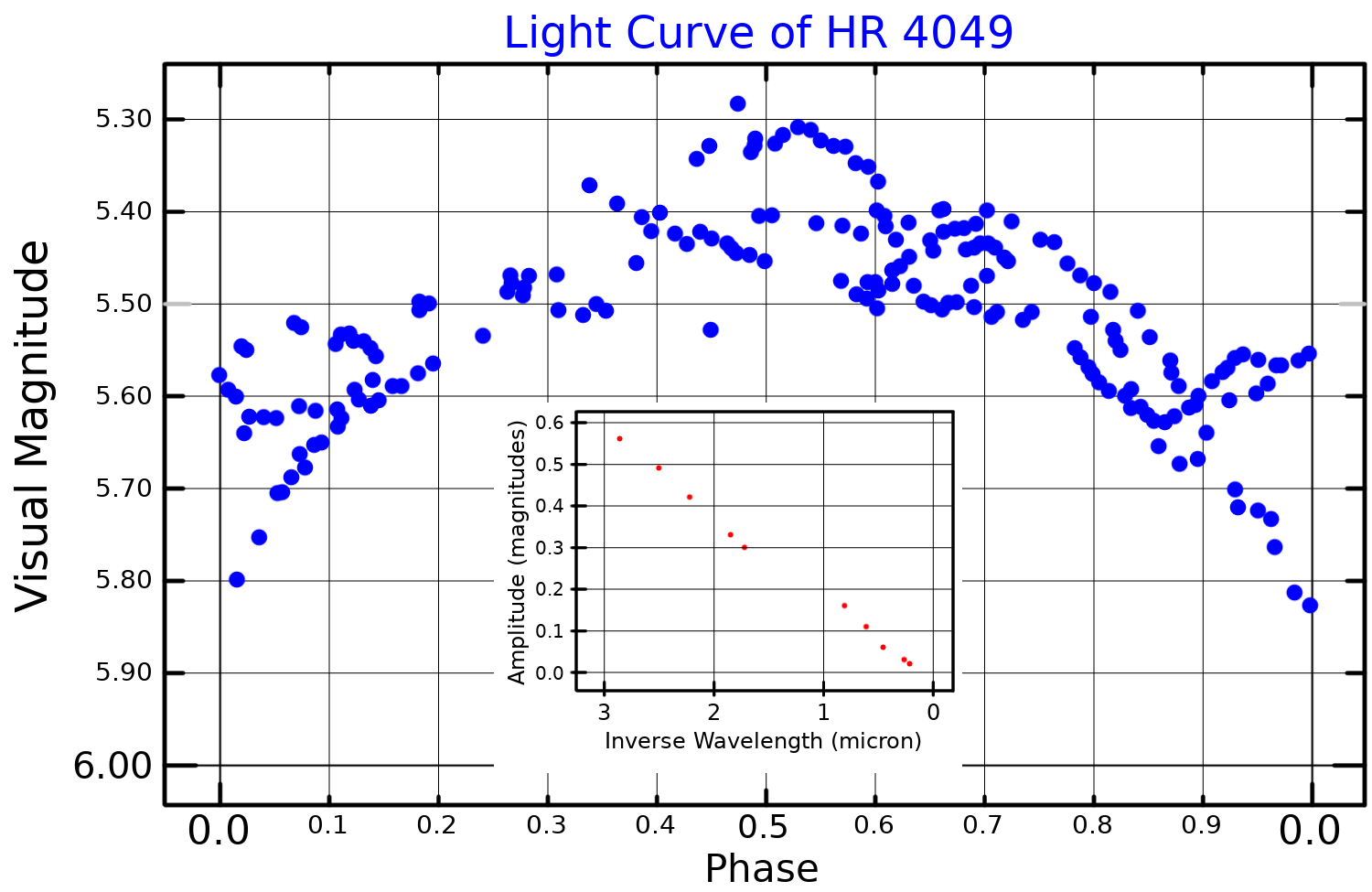
Light curve for HR 4049. The main plot shows the visual band brightness over one orbital period. The inset plot shows how the amplitude of the brightness change varies as a function of wavelength^{−1}; as the observing wavelength increases, the opacity of the dust decreases, so the dust obscures less of the star's light. Adapted from Jorissen & Frankowski (2008)

HR 4049 is an unusual variable star, ranging between magnitudes 5.29 and 5.83 with a period of 429 days. It has been described as pulsating in a similar fashion to an RV Tauri variable, although the preferred interpretation is that the variations are produced by variable extinction produced by the material around the star and that the period is the same as the orbital period.

It was discovered to be a variable star by Christoffel Waelkens and Fredy Rufener in 1983 and was given the variable star designation AG Antliae in 1987, but is still more commonly referred to as HR 4049.
