= List of stars in Corvus =

This is the list of notable stars in the constellation Corvus, sorted by decreasing brightness.

Name	B	F	Var	HD	HIP	RA	Dec	vis. mag.	abs. mag.	Dist. (ly)	Sp. class	Notes
γ Crv	γ	4		106625	59803	12^{h} 15^{m} 48.47^{s}	−17° 32′ 31.1″	2.58	−0.94	165	B8III	Gienah Corvi, Gienah, Gienah Ghurab, Djenah al Ghyrab al Eymen, Dextra ala Corvi; suspected variable, V_{max} = 2.56^{m}, V_{min} = 2.60^{m}
β Crv	β	9		109379	61359	12^{h} 34^{m} 23.23^{s}	−23° 23′ 47.8″	2.65	−0.51	140	G5II	Kraz, Tso Hea; suspected variable, V_{max} = 2.60^{m}, V_{min} = 2.66^{m}
δ Crv	δ	7		108767	60965	12^{h} 29^{m} 51.98^{s}	−16° 30′ 54.3″	2.94	0.79	88	B9.5V	Algorab, Algoral, Algorel, Algores; double star; suspected variable, V_{max} = 2.91^{m}, V_{min} = 2.96^{m}
ε Crv	ε	2		105707	59316	12^{h} 10^{m} 07.53^{s}	−22° 37′ 11.3″	3.02	−1.82	303	K2III	Minkar; suspected variable, V_{max} = 2.98^{m}, V_{min} = 3.06^{m}
α Crv	α	1		105452	59199	12^{h} 08^{m} 24.75^{s}	−24° 43′ 43.6″	4.02	3.17	48	F0IV/V	Al Chiba, Al Minliar al Ghurab, Alchiba, Alchita, Alkhiba, Minkar al Ghyrab, Rostrum Corvi;
η Crv	η	8		109085	61174	12^{h} 32^{m} 04.48^{s}	−16° 11′ 45.1″	4.30	3.00	59	F2V	suspected variable, V_{max} = 4.29^{m}, V_{min} = 4.32^{m}
HD 107418	υ			107418	60221	12^{h} 20^{m} 55.72^{s}	−13° 33′ 56.7″	5.15	1.24	201	K0III	suspected variable, V_{max} = 5.14^{m}, V_{min} = 5.17^{m}
VV Crv	κ		VV	110317	61910	12^{h} 41^{m} 16.02^{s}	−13° 00′ 50.1″	5.17	0.51	278	F3IV	quadruple star; Algol variable
ζ Crv	ζ	5		107348	60189	12^{h} 20^{m} 33.71^{s}	−22° 12′ 57.0″	5.20	−0.16	385	B8V	Chang Sha (長沙); emission-line star; double star, suspected variable
31 Crt	(μ)	(31)	TY	104337	58587	12^{h} 00^{m} 51.17^{s}	−19° 39′ 32.4″	5.28	−3.37	1753	B2IV	spectroscopic binary; rotating ellipsoidal variable; once mistaken for a moon of Mercury
3 Crv	θ	3		105850	59394	12^{h} 11^{m} 03.88^{s}	−23° 36′ 08.5″	5.45	1.70	183	A1V	
HD 109272				109272	61296	12^{h} 33^{m} 34.27^{s}	−12° 49′ 49.2″	5.58	2.15	158	G8III/IV	
HD 108821				108821	61015	12^{h} 30^{m} 17.46^{s}	−23° 41′ 47.1″	5.63	−1.57	898	M0III	
6 Crv	ι	6		107815	60425	12^{h} 23^{m} 21.60^{s}	−24° 50′ 26.2″	5.66	0.73	316	K1III	
HD 109141	ο			109141	61212	12^{h} 32^{m} 36.09^{s}	−13° 51′ 32.3″	5.74	2.90	120	F3IV/V	
HD 106485				106485	59728	12^{h} 14^{m} 59.58^{s}	−20° 50′ 39.2″	5.82	0.65	353	K0IIICN...	
HD 107295				107295	60157	12^{h} 20^{m} 10.83^{s}	−22° 10′ 32.3″	5.94	0.13	474	K0III+...	double star
HD 109931	μ			109931	61688	12^{h} 38^{m} 44.69^{s}	−18° 15′ 00.6″	6.00	2.03	203	F0V	
HD 110385				110385	61951	12^{h} 41^{m} 49.51^{s}	−19° 45′ 32.9″	6.02	1.91	216	F2V	
HD 106819	ρ			106819	59895	12^{h} 17^{m} 03.36^{s}	−16° 41′ 37.5″	6.05	−0.04	540	A2V	suspected variable, V_{max} = 5.82^{m}, V_{min} = 6.06^{m}
HD 112304				112304	63109	12^{h} 55^{m} 53.25^{s}	−15° 19′ 37.3″	6.18	−0.38	669	A0V	
TU Crv			TU	109585	61496	12^{h} 35^{m} 58.77^{s}	−20° 31′ 38.5″	6.20	1.77	251	F0III	δ Sct variable
HD 109238				109238	61270	12^{h} 33^{m} 22.27^{s}	−19° 47′ 32.9″	6.26	0.65	432	F0IV/V	suspected variable, ΔV = 0.03^{m}
HD 104307				104307	58574	12^{h} 00^{m} 42.23^{s}	−21° 50′ 14.9″	6.28	0.22	532	K2III	double star
HD 108477				108477	60809	12^{h} 27^{m} 49.45^{s}	−16° 37′ 54.7″	6.30	−1.67	1278	G5II	
HD 108799				108799	60994	12^{h} 30^{m} 04.93^{s}	−13° 23′ 35.0″	6.37	4.38	81	G1/G2V	multiple star
HD 109132				109132	61208	12^{h} 32^{m} 32.89^{s}	−21° 12′ 43.2″	6.41	0.86	419	K0III	
TT Crv			TT	107814	60421	12^{h} 23^{m} 18.90^{s}	−11° 48′ 43.5″	6.48	−0.68	881	M3III	semiregular variable, V_{max} = 6.47^{m}, V_{min} = 6.57^{m}, P = 11.5 d
R Crv			R	107199	60106	12^{h} 19^{m} 37.87^{s}	−19° 15′ 21.8″	6.70			M4.5-9:3	Mira variable, V_{max} = 6.7^{m}, V_{min} = 14.4^{m}, P = 317.03 d
HD 111031				111031	62345	12^{h} 46^{m} 30.85^{s}	−11° 48′ 44.8″	6.88	4.45	99	G5V	has an unconfirmed planet (b)
HD 103774				103774	58263	11^{h} 56^{m} 56.0^{s}	−12° 06′ 28″	7.12		179	F5V	has a planet (b)
HD 104067				104067	58451	11^{h} 59^{m} 10.01^{s}	−20° 21′ 13.6″	7.93	6.34	68	K2V	has a planet (b)
HD 111980				111980	62882	12^{h} 53^{m} 15.05^{s}	−18° 31′ 20.0″	8.38		310.5	F7V	high-velocity star
RV Crv			RV	109796	61620	12^{h} 37^{m} 40.71^{s}	−19° 34′ 40.1″	8.76		656	F0V	β Lyr variable, V_{max} = 8.6^{m}, V_{min} = 9.16^{m}, P = 0.7472521 d
SX Crv			SX	110139	61825	12^{h} 40^{m} 15.04^{s}	−18° 48′ 00.9″	9.11		298.0	F7V	W UMa variable, V_{max} = 8.99^{m}, V_{min} = 9.25^{m}, P = 0.3166386 d
W Crv			W			12^{h} 07^{m} 37.36^{s}	−13° 08′ 59.0″	11.28			G2Iab	β Lyr variable, V_{max} = 11.16^{m}, V_{min} = 12.5^{m}, P = 0.38808083 d
TV Crv			TV			12^{h} 20^{m} 24.15^{s}	−18° 27′ 02.0″	12.2				Tombaugh's Star
WASP-83						12^{h} 40^{m} 37.0^{s}	−19° 17′ 03″	12.9		978	G8	has a transiting planet (b)
DENIS-P J1228.2-1547						12^{h} 28^{m} 15.23^{s}	−15° 47′ 34.2″			66.0	L5V	binary brown dwarf
Table legend: • Name = Proper name • B = Bayer designation • F or/and G. = Flamsteed designation or Gould designation • Var = Variable-star designation • HD = Henry Draper Catalogue designation number • HIP = Hipparcos Catalogue designation number • RA = Right ascension for the Epoch/Equinox J2000.0 • Dec = Declination for the Epoch/Equinox J2000.0 • vis. mag. = visual magnitude (m or m_{v}), also known as apparent magnitude • abs. mag. = absolute magnitude (M_{v}) • Dist. (ly) = Distance in light-years from Earth • Sp. class = Spectral class of the star in the stellar classification system • Notes = Common name(s) or alternate name(s); comments; notable properties [for example: multiple star status, range of variability if it is a variable star, exoplanets, etc.]

== See also ==
- List of stars by constellation
