= Corvus in Chinese astronomy =

According to traditional Chinese uranography, the modern constellation Corvus is located within the southern quadrant of the sky, which is symbolized as the Vermilion Bird of the South (南方朱雀, Nán Fāng Zhū Què).

The name of the western constellation in modern Chinese is 烏鴉座 (wū yā zuò), meaning "the crow constellation".

== Stars ==
The map of Chinese constellation in constellation Corvus area consists of:

Four Symbols	Mansion (Chinese name)	Romanization	Translation	Asterisms (Chinese name)	Romanization	Translation	Western star name	Proper Name	Chinese star name	Romanization	Translation
Vermilion Bird of the South (南方朱雀)	軫	Zhěn	Chariot	軫	Zhěn	Chariot					
Vermilion Bird of the South (南方朱雀)	軫	Zhěn	Chariot	軫	Zhěn	Chariot	γ Crv	Gienah (for component A			
Vermilion Bird of the South (南方朱雀)	軫	Zhěn	Chariot	軫	Zhěn	Chariot	γ Crv	Gienah (for component A	軫宿一	Zhěnsùyī	1st star
Vermilion Bird of the South (南方朱雀)	軫	Zhěn	Chariot	軫	Zhěn	Chariot	γ Crv	Gienah (for component A	軫宿距星	Zhěnsùjùxīng	Separated star
Vermilion Bird of the South (南方朱雀)	軫	Zhěn	Chariot	軫	Zhěn	Chariot	γ Crv	Gienah (for component A	軫宿西北星	Zhěnsùxīběixīng	Northwestern star
Vermilion Bird of the South (南方朱雀)	軫	Zhěn	Chariot	軫	Zhěn	Chariot	γ Crv	Gienah (for component A	井宿西扇北第星	Jǐngsùxīshānběidìxīng	Star in the west of Well and the leader star of northern area
Vermilion Bird of the South (南方朱雀)	軫	Zhěn	Chariot	軫	Zhěn	Chariot	ε Crv				
Vermilion Bird of the South (南方朱雀)	軫	Zhěn	Chariot	軫	Zhěn	Chariot	ε Crv		軫宿二	Zhěnsùèr	2nd star
Vermilion Bird of the South (南方朱雀)	軫	Zhěn	Chariot	軫	Zhěn	Chariot	ε Crv		軫宿西南星	Zhěnsùxīnánxīng	Southwestern star
Vermilion Bird of the South (南方朱雀)	軫	Zhěn	Chariot	軫	Zhěn	Chariot	δ Crv	Algorab			
Vermilion Bird of the South (南方朱雀)	軫	Zhěn	Chariot	軫	Zhěn	Chariot	δ Crv	Algorab	軫宿三	Zhěnsùsān	3rd star
Vermilion Bird of the South (南方朱雀)	軫	Zhěn	Chariot	軫	Zhěn	Chariot	δ Crv	Algorab	軫宿东北星	Zhěnsùdōngběixīng	Northeastern star
Vermilion Bird of the South (南方朱雀)	軫	Zhěn	Chariot	軫	Zhěn	Chariot	β Crv	Kraz			
Vermilion Bird of the South (南方朱雀)	軫	Zhěn	Chariot	軫	Zhěn	Chariot	β Crv	Kraz	軫宿四	Zhěnsùsì	4th star
Vermilion Bird of the South (南方朱雀)	軫	Zhěn	Chariot	軫	Zhěn	Chariot	β Crv	Kraz	軫宿东南星	Zhěnsùdōngnánxīng	Southeastern star
Vermilion Bird of the South (南方朱雀)	軫	Zhěn	Chariot	軫	Zhěn	Chariot	31 Crt		軫宿增三	Zhěnsùzēngsān	3rd additional star
Vermilion Bird of the South (南方朱雀)	軫	Zhěn	Chariot	軫	Zhěn	Chariot	3 Crv		軫宿增四	Zhěnsùzēngsì	4th additional star
Vermilion Bird of the South (南方朱雀)	軫	Zhěn	Chariot	軫	Zhěn	Chariot	6 Crv		軫宿增五	Zhěnsùzēngwǔ	5th additional star
Vermilion Bird of the South (南方朱雀)	軫	Zhěn	Chariot	長沙	Chángshā	Changsha					
Vermilion Bird of the South (南方朱雀)	軫	Zhěn	Chariot	長沙	Chángshā	Changsha	ζ Crv				
Vermilion Bird of the South (南方朱雀)	軫	Zhěn	Chariot	長沙	Chángshā	Changsha	ζ Crv		長沙	Chángshā	(One star of)
Vermilion Bird of the South (南方朱雀)	軫	Zhěn	Chariot	長沙	Chángshā	Changsha	ζ Crv		寿星	Shòuxīng	God of longevity
Vermilion Bird of the South (南方朱雀)	軫	Zhěn	Chariot	左轄	Zuǒxiá	Left Linchpin	η Crv		左轄	Zuǒxiá	(One star of)
Vermilion Bird of the South (南方朱雀)	軫	Zhěn	Chariot	右轄	Yòuxiá	Right Linchpin	α Crv	Alchiba	右轄	Yòuxiá	(One star of)

== See also ==
- Chinese astronomy
- Traditional Chinese star names
- Chinese constellations
