= Corvi =

Corvi may refer to:

== Astronomy ==
- Alpha Corvi
- Beta Corvi
- Delta Corvi
- Epsilon Corvi
- Eta Corvi
- Gamma Corvi
- Zeta Corvi

== People ==
- Domenico Corvi (1721–1803), Italian painter
- Enzo Corvi (born 1992), Swiss professional ice hockey center

== Surnames ==
- Corvi, surname of a noble and historic Italian family descended from the gens Valeria

== Other ==
- I Corvi (Italian for "The Crows"), Italian beat group
