= Hasta (nakshatra) =

Lunar ecliptic segment in Hindu astrology

Map of Corvus (Hasta)

Hasta (हस्त), meaning "hand", is the thirteenth nakshatra (lunar mansion) in Indian astronomy and astrology, having a spread from 10° to 23° 20′. It corresponds to the stars α, β, γ, δ, and ε Corvi in the constellation Corvus.

== See also ==
- Archaeoastronomy and Vedic chronology
