= 2520 =

2520 may refer to:

- 2520 (number) - the first number that is divisible from every number 1-10.
- The year 2520 in the 26th century
- LHS 2520, a red dwarf star
- 2520 Novorossijsk, an asteroid
- Nokia Lumia 2520, a tablet created by Nokia
- Yamato 2520, a sequel to Space Battleship Yamato
- German submarine U-2520, a submarine
