= NGC 4727 =

Galaxy in the constellation Corvus

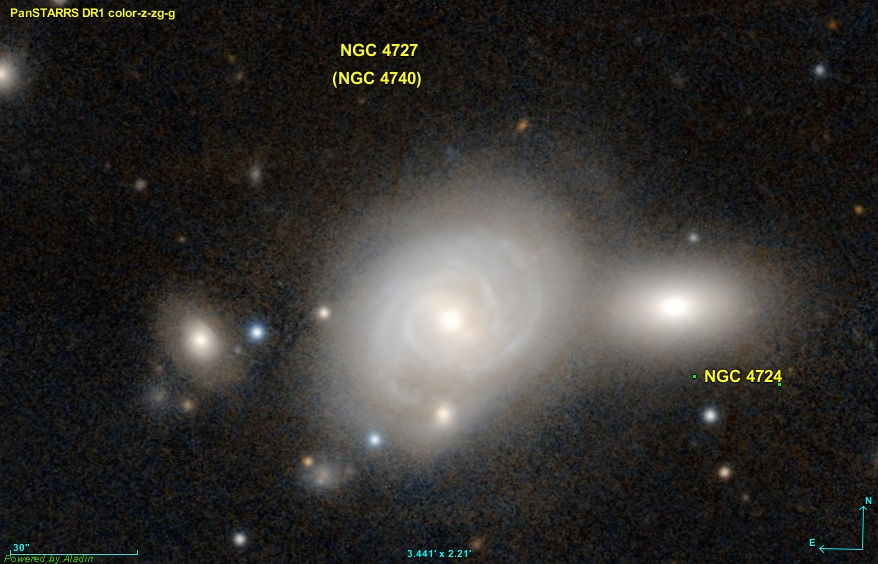
- NGC 4727 (center) with NGC 4724 (right) imaged by Pan-STARRS

Observation data (J2000 epoch)
- Constellation: Corvus
- Right ascension: 12^{h} 50^{m} 57.2497^{s}
- Declination: −14° 19′ 58.350″
- Redshift: 0.025001
- Heliocentric radial velocity: 7,495±0 km/s
- Distance: 376.7 ± 26.4 Mly (115.49 ± 8.09 Mpc)
- Apparent magnitude (V): 11.8

Characteristics
- Type: SAB(r)bc pec?
- Size: ~251,400 ly (77.07 kpc) (estimated)
- Apparent size (V): 1.6′ × 1.2′

Other designations
- HOLM 470A, IRAS 12483-1403, NGC 4740, MCG -02-33-023, PGC 43499

NGC 4727 is a large barred spiral galaxy in the constellation of Corvus. Its velocity with respect to the cosmic microwave background for is 7,830±23 km/s, which corresponds to a Hubble distance of 376.7 ± 26.4 Mly (115.49 ± 8.09 Mpc). It was discovered by German-British astronomer William Herschel on 8 February 1785. It was also observed by Lewis Swift on 27 April 1887, causing it to be listed twice in the New General Catalogue, as NGC 4727 and as NGC 4740.

NGC 4727 and NGC 4724 are listed together as Holm 470 in Erik Holmberg's A Study of Double and Multiple Galaxies Together with Inquiries into some General Metagalactic Problems, published in 1937.

== Supernovae ==
Two supernovae have been observed in NGC 4727:

- SN 1965B (type unknown, mag. 16) was discovered by Mexican astronomer Enrique Chavira on 8 January 1965.
- SN 2003eg (Type II, mag. 15.8) was discovered by LOTOSS (Lick Observatory and Tenagra Observatory Supernova Searches) on 17 May 2003.

== See also ==
- List of NGC objects (4001–5000)
