= Ross 695 =

Red dwarf star in the constellation Corvus

Observation data Epoch J2000 Equinox ICRS
- Constellation: Corvus
- Right ascension: 12^{h} 24^{m} 52.50301^{s}
- Declination: −18° 14′ 32.2571″
- Apparent magnitude (V): 11.272

Characteristics
- Evolutionary stage: main sequence
- Spectral type: M2.0V
- B−V color index: 1.591

Astrometry
Radial velocity (R_{v})	51.06±0.17 km/s
Proper motion (μ)	RA: +1,095.592 mas/yr Dec.: −2,309.019 mas/yr
Parallax (π)	112.6740±0.0241 mas
Distance	28.947 ± 0.006 ly (8.875 ± 0.002 pc)
Absolute magnitude (M_{V})	11.54

Details
Mass	0.262±0.012 M_{☉}
Radius	0.271±0.008 R_{☉}
Luminosity	0.00980±0.00015 L_{☉}
Surface gravity (log g)	4.98±0.07 cgs
Temperature	3485±51 K
Metallicity [Fe/H]	−0.17±0.16 dex

Other designations
- GJ 465, HIP 60559, LFT 904, LHS 45, LPM 424, LTT 4685, PLX 2857, Ross 695

Database references
SIMBAD	data

Ross 695, also known as Gliese 465, is a red dwarf star in the southern constellation of Corvus. The distance to this star, based on parallax measurements by the Gaia spacecraft, is 28.947 light-years (8.875 parsecs). It is the nearest star in this constellation. Despite its closeness, this star is intrinsically faint and, at apparent magnitude 11.27, is too faint to be seen with the unaided eye.

This star has a spectral type of M2.0V; with around 26.2% the mass and 27.1% the radius of the Sun, but only 0.98% its luminosity. The effective temperature of the star is 3490 K, giving it a reddish hue. Its iron-to-hydrogen ratio appears to be lower than that of the Sun.

Investigation of its radial velocity has failed to find any evidence of a planetary companion.
