= R Corvi =

Variable star in the constellation Corvus

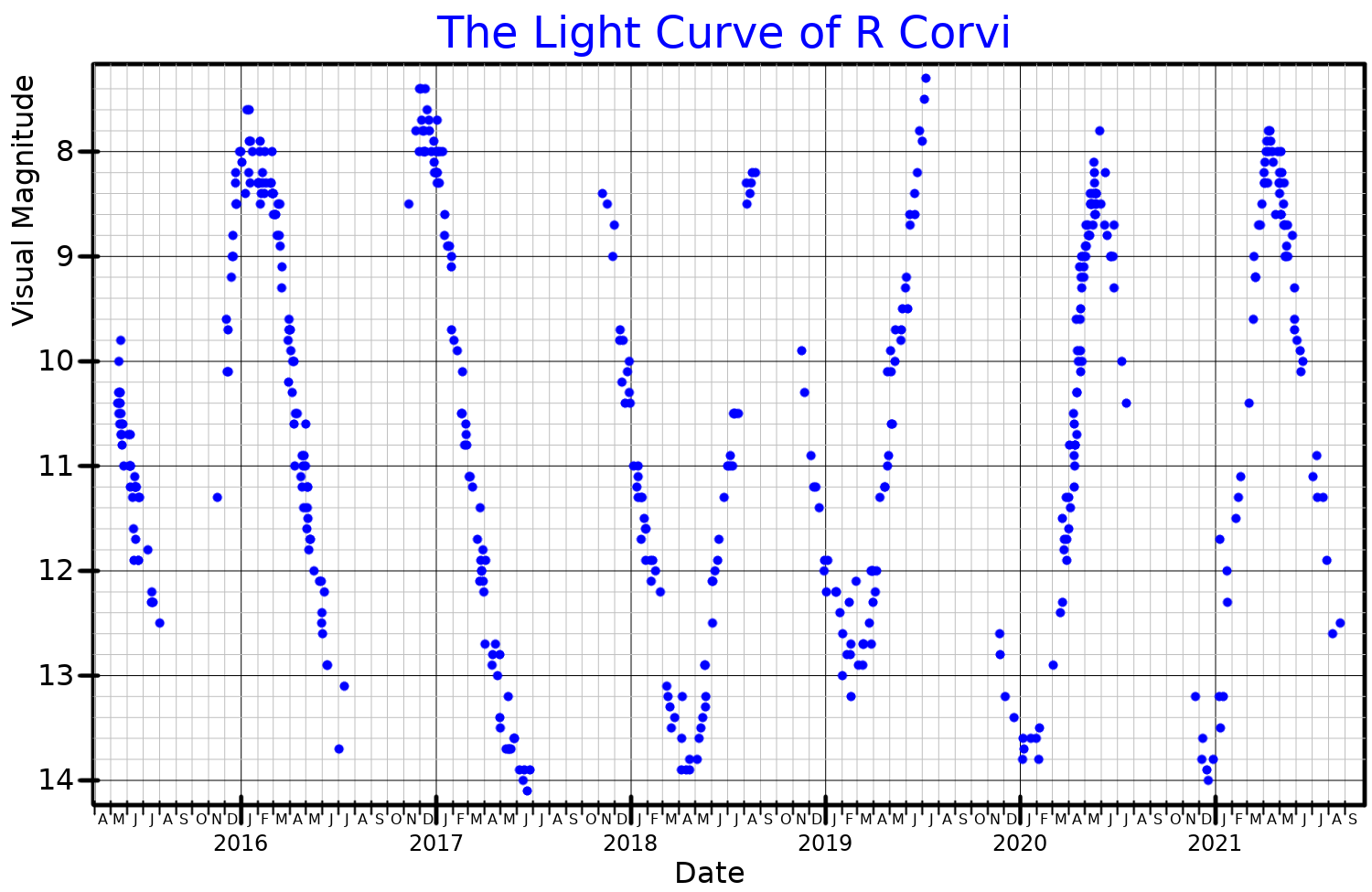
- The visual band light curve of R Corvi, from AAVSO data

Observation data Epoch J2000 Equinox J2000
- Constellation: Corvus
- Right ascension: 12^{h} 19^{m} 37.8707^{s}
- Declination: −19° 15′ 21.862″
- Apparent magnitude (V): 6.7 to 14.4

Characteristics
- Evolutionary stage: AGB
- Spectral type: M4.5e-M9e
- U−B color index: +0.16
- B−V color index: +1.53
- Variable type: Mira

Astrometry
Radial velocity (R_{v})	−22.00 km/s
Proper motion (μ)	RA: −4.247 mas/yr Dec.: −8.663 mas/yr
Parallax (π)	1.2136±0.0718 mas
Distance	2,700 ± 200 ly (820 ± 50 pc)

Details
Mass	3.4 M_{☉}
Surface gravity (log g)	1.59 cgs
Temperature	3,857 K
Metallicity [Fe/H]	−0.38 dex

Other designations
- R Cvr, BD−18°3367, HD 107199, HIP 60106, SAO 157211

Database references
SIMBAD	data

R Corvi (R Crv) is a Mira variable star in the constellation Corvus, which ranges from a magnitude of 6.7 to 14.4 with a period of approximately 317 days. In the sky it appears close to Gamma Corvi and can be seen in the same binocular field. Extrapolating its luminosity from its period of 317 days yields a distance of 810 parsecs.

Franciszek Karliński discovered that the star's brightness varies, in 1867.
