= NGC 4782 =

Galaxy in the constellation Corvus

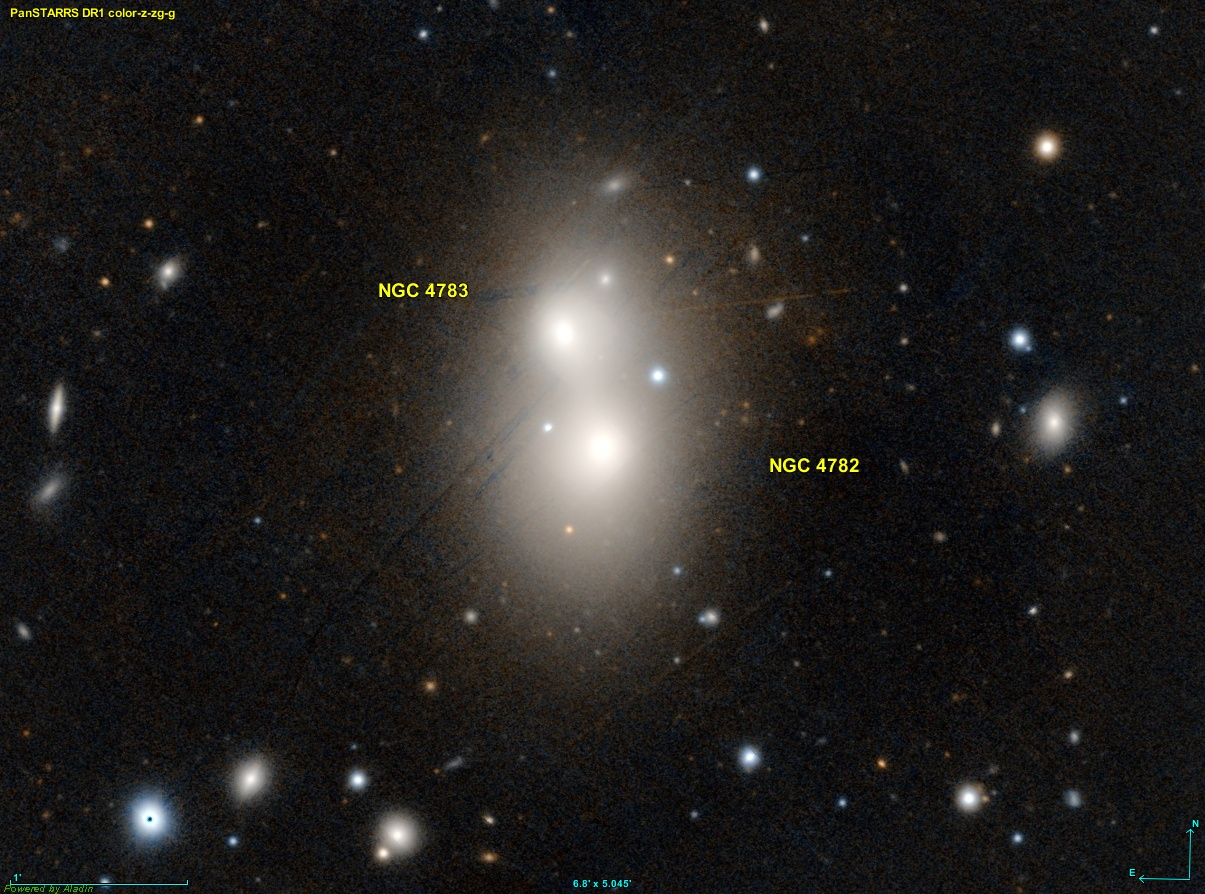
- NGC 4782 (lower) with NGC 4783 (upper) imaged by Pan-STARRS

Observation data (J2000 epoch)
- Constellation: Corvus
- Right ascension: 12^{h} 54^{m} 35.7318^{s}
- Declination: −12° 34′ 07.420″
- Redshift: 0.015437
- Heliocentric radial velocity: 4,628±19 km/s
- Distance: 238.7 ± 16.8 Mly (73.18 ± 5.15 Mpc)
- Apparent magnitude (V): 11.7

Characteristics
- Type: E0 pec
- Size: ~217,500 ly (66.69 kpc) (estimated)
- Apparent size (V): 1.8′ × 1.7′

Other designations
- HOLM 485A, MCG -02-33-050, PGC 43924, VV 201a

NGC 4782 is an elliptical galaxy in the constellation of Corvus. Its velocity with respect to the cosmic microwave background for is 4,962±30 km/s, which corresponds to a Hubble distance of 238.7 ± 16.8 Mly (73.18 ± 5.15 Mpc). However, nine non-redshift measurements give a closer distance of 189.86 ± 22.21 Mly (58.211 ± 6.811 Mpc). It was discovered by German-British astronomer William Herschel on 27 March 1786.

NGC 4782 along with NGC 4783 are listed together as Holm 485 in Erik Holmberg's A Study of Double and Multiple Galaxies Together with Inquiries into some General Metagalactic Problems, published in 1937. They are also listed as VV 201 in the Vorontsov-Vel'yaminov Interacting Galaxies catalogue. However, since NGC 4782 is about 31.1 Mly (9.54 Mpc) farther away than NGC 4783 (using Hubble distance), the grouping is purely optical.

The SIMBAD database lists NGC 4782 as a radio galaxy, i.e. it has giant regions of radio emission extending well beyond its visible structure.

== Supernovae ==
Two supernovae have been observed in NGC 4782:

- SN 1956B (type unknown, mag. 18.6) was discovered by Fritz Zwicky on 8 April 1956.
- SN 2015B (Type Ia, mag. 15) was discovered by the Italian Supernovae Search Project on 5 January 2015.

== See also ==
- List of NGC objects (4001–5000)
