= Stargate (asterism) =

Asterism in Corvus

Stargate Cluster
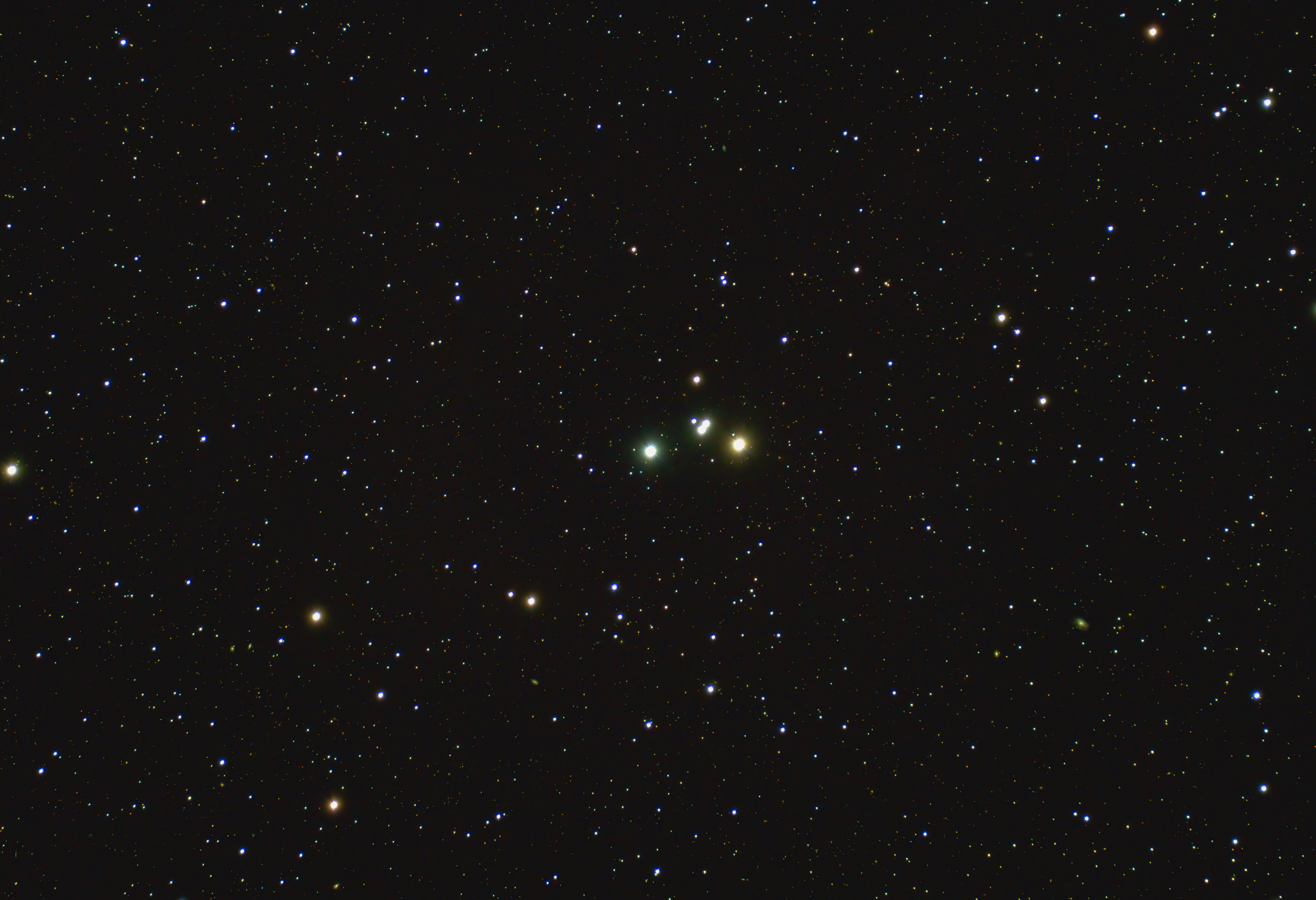
- Amateur astronomer photo of the Stargate asterism by Mark Johnston

Observation data (J2000 epoch)
- Right ascension: 12^{h} 35^{m} 59^{s}
- Declination: −12° 03′ 09″
- Apparent magnitude (V): 6.61 to 11.56

Physical characteristics
- Other designations: STF 1659

Associations
- Constellation: Corvus

The Stargate Asterism or Stargate Cluster is an asterism in the constellation Corvus consisting of six stars, also known as STF 1659.

Star	Tycho id	Hipparcos id	Magnitude	Distance (ly)	Spectral Type
A	5530-02065-1	61466	7.92	354	G0
B	5530-02062-1	61465	8.34	285	
C	5531-01564-1	None	11.46	Unknown	
D	5531-01190-1	None	9.91	Unknown	
E	5530-02063-1	61449	6.69	486	G5
F	5531-01561-1	61486	6.61	402	F0

== See also ==
- Lists of stars
