= LHS 2520 =

Star in the constellation Corvus

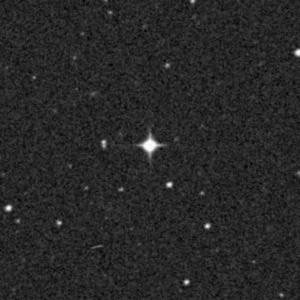
- LHS 2520

Observation data Epoch J2000 Equinox ICRS
- Constellation: Corvus
- Right ascension: 12^{h} 10^{m} 05.60124^{s}
- Declination: −15° 04′ 16.9613″
- Apparent magnitude (V): 12.12

Characteristics
- Spectral type: M3.5V

Astrometry
Radial velocity (R_{v})	80.47±0.26 km/s
Proper motion (μ)	RA: −56.437 mas/yr Dec.: −712.957 mas/yr
Parallax (π)	81.5703±0.0354 mas
Distance	39.98 ± 0.02 ly (12.259 ± 0.005 pc)

Details
Temperature	3024 K

Other designations
- LHS 2520, GJ 3707, LP 734-32

Database references
SIMBAD	data
ARICNS	data

LHS 2520, also known as GJ 3707, is a red dwarf star in the constellation Corvus. With an apparent magnitude of 12.12, it is too faint to be seen with the unaided eye. A cool star of spectral type M3.5V, it has a surface temperature of 3024 K. The star was too faint to have had its parallax measured by the Hipparcos satellite. Measurement by Gaia gives its parallax as 81.57±0.04 milliarcseconds, yielding a distance of 40 light-years (12 parsecs).

== In popular culture ==
In Action Comics #14 (January 2013), which was published 7 November 2012, Neil Degrasse Tyson appears in the story, in which he determines that Superman's home planet, Krypton, orbited LHS 2520. Tyson assisted DC Comics in selecting a real-life star that would be an appropriate parent star to Krypton, and picked the star in Corvus, since Superman's high school sports team is the Smallville Crows.

The star also appears as LP 734-32 in the 2014 game, Elite Dangerous.
