= TV Corvi =

Star in the constellation Corvus

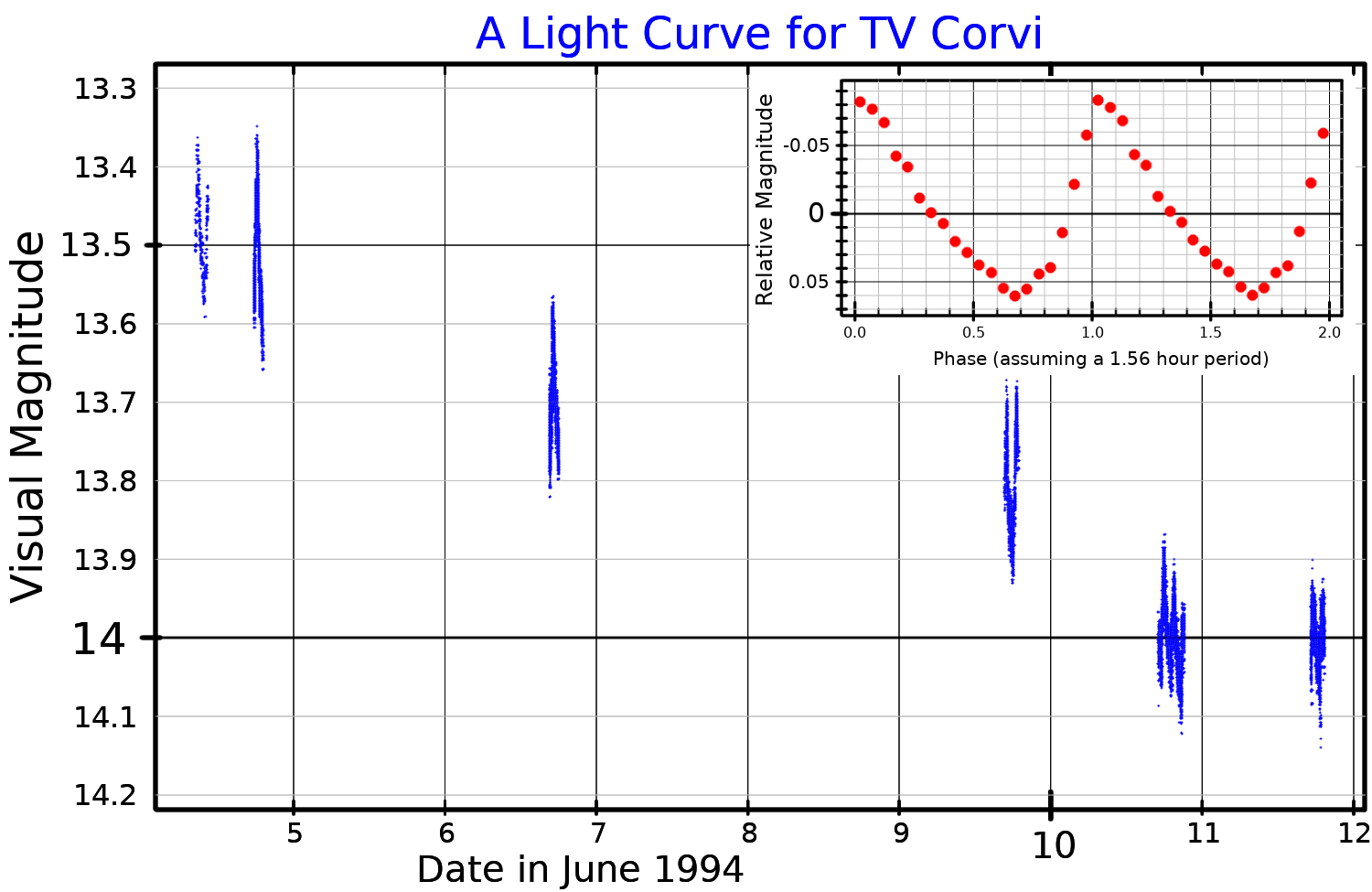
- A visual band light curve for TV Corvi, adapted from Howell et al. (1996). The main plot shows the decay from a superoutburt in June of 1994, and the inset plot shows an average of the superhumps seen during that decay.

Observation data Epoch J2000 Equinox ICRS
- Constellation: Corvus
- Right ascension: 12^{h} 20^{m} 24.167^{s}
- Declination: −18° 27′ 02.15″
- Apparent magnitude (V): 13.0 - 19.5

Characteristics
- Spectral type: DC
- Variable type: CV

Astrometry
Radial velocity (R_{v})	+108.86±9.33 km/s
Proper motion (μ)	RA: −23.032 mas/yr Dec.: −2.583 mas/yr
Parallax (π)	3.1215±0.1548 mas
Distance	1,040 ± 50 ly (320 ± 20 pc)

Other designations
- Tombaugh's Star, TV Crv

Database references
SIMBAD	data

TV Corvi, also known as Tombaugh's Star, is a dwarf nova of the SU Ursae Majoris type in the constellation Corvus that was first discovered by accident as a mysterious 12th magnitude star on a plate by Clyde Tombaugh while looking for remote planets on May 25, 1932, before its identity was confirmed as a dwarf nova by David Levy in 1990.

== Discovery ==
At 11 a.m. on May 25, 1932, Tombaugh noted the object on a photographic slide taken on March 23, 1931. He took 362 plates of the area between 1930 and 1944 looking for planets beyond Neptune. It was not visible on other slides and he suspected that it was a nova. He told his superior Carl Lampland but the discovery was not reported further. Variable star observer David Levy found out about the object while researching and writing Tombaugh's biography in 1988. He discovered a further nine outbursts after inspecting 260 photographic plates that spanned the next sixty years, and then set about watching the star. After almost 70 nights, he finally saw an outburst on March 23, 1990. He proposed naming the star Tombaugh's Star.

== Location ==
TV Corvi is unusual in that it lies far from the galactic plane, unlike most other cataclysmic variables. In 1996, Howell and colleagues calculated it to lie 350 ± 250 parsecs distant from Earth. This is consistent with the value obtained by the Gaia spacecraft using stellar parallax, which is 320 ± 20 pc from Earth.

== Properties ==
The system consists of a white dwarf and a donor companion which orbit around a common centre of gravity every 1.5096 hours (90.54 minutes). The white dwarf sucks matter from the other star via its Roche lobe onto an accretion disc which is heated and changes viscosity before collapsing, typically reaching magnitude 13 in these outbursts and remaining near magnitude 19 when quiet. In TV Corvi, these outbursts can be split into frequent eruptions and two types of less frequent supereruptions, behaviour found in a group of dwarf novae known as SU Ursae Majoris stars. The AAVSO has recorded maxima as bright as visual magnitude 12.2.

The donor star has been calculated to have only 10.8% the mass of the Sun. It is now thought to be a brown dwarf; the distance between it and its white dwarf companion is less than the diameter of the Sun.
