= TU Corvi =

Star in the constellation Corvus

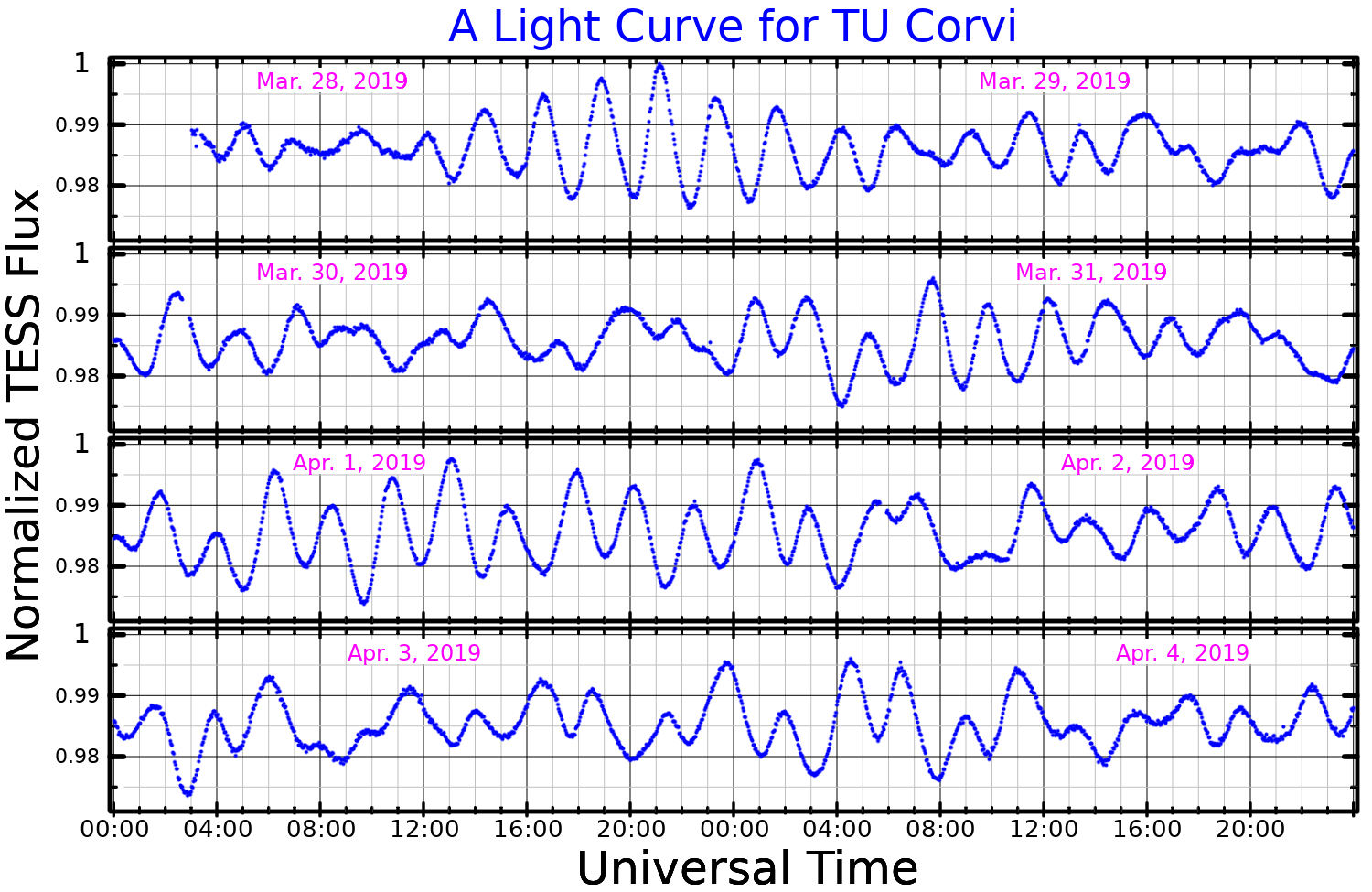
- A light curve for TU Corvi, plotted from TESS data

Observation data Epoch J2000 Equinox ICRS
- Constellation: Corvus
- Right ascension: 12^{h} 35^{m} 58.79603^{s}
- Declination: −20° 31′ 38.9160″
- Apparent magnitude (V): 6.20

Characteristics
- Evolutionary stage: main sequence
- Spectral type: F0 V
- B−V color index: 0.34±0.01
- Variable type: δ Sct

Astrometry
Radial velocity (R_{v})	−2.0±4.3 km/s
Proper motion (μ)	RA: +30.202 mas/yr Dec.: −51.280 mas/yr
Parallax (π)	13.2558±0.3343 mas
Distance	246 ± 6 ly (75 ± 2 pc)
Absolute magnitude (M_{V})	2.08

Details
Mass	1.45 M_{☉}
Radius	2.7 R_{☉}
Luminosity	12.6+1.2 −1.1 L_{☉}
Surface gravity (log g)	3.93±0.14 cgs
Temperature	7,132±242 K
Metallicity [Fe/H]	−0.07±0.07 dex
Rotational velocity (v sin i)	103 km/s
Age	786 Myr

Other designations
- TU Crv, AAVSO 1230-19, BD−19°3521, HD 109585, HIP 61496, HR 4797, SAO 180937

Database references
SIMBAD	data

TU Corvi is a yellow-white hued star in the southern constellation of Corvus. It is a dimly visible to the naked eye with an apparent visual magnitude of 6.20. The distance to this star can be estimated from its annual parallax shift of 13.3 mas, yielding a range of about 246 light years. Based upon measured changes in its proper motion, it may be a close binary system.

This is an F-type main-sequence star with a stellar classification of F0 V. Previously it had been classed as F0 III, matching an evolved giant star. It is a Delta Scuti variable, varying by an amplitude of 0.025 in B magnitude with a period of 118 minutes. At the age of 786 million years, it has a high rate of spin with a projected rotational velocity of 103 km/s. The star has 1.45 times the mass of the Sun and is radiating 12.6 times the Sun's luminosity from its photosphere at an effective temperature of 7,132 K.
