= VV Corvi =

Binary star in the constellation Corvus

- Location of VV Corvi (circled in red)

Observation data Epoch J2000 Equinox ICRS
- Constellation: Corvus
- Right ascension: 12^{h} 41^{m} 15.9526^{s}
- Declination: −13° 00′ 50.036″
- Apparent magnitude (V): 5.843±0.010 (6.10 + 7.54)

Characteristics
- Spectral type: F5V + F5V
- U−B color index: +0.10
- B−V color index: +0.42
- Variable type: Eclipsing

Astrometry
Radial velocity (R_{v})	−10.15±0.16 km/s
Proper motion (μ)	RA: −117.671 mas/yr Dec.: +8.138 mas/yr
Parallax (π)	12.2688±0.0530 mas
Distance	266 ± 1 ly (81.5 ± 0.4 pc)
Absolute magnitude (M_{V})	1.581±0.034

Orbit
Primary	VV Corvi A
Name	VV Corvi B
Period (P)	3.1445072±0.0000003 days
Semi-major axis (a)	13.67±0.02 R_{☉}
Eccentricity (e)	0.0836±0.0020
Inclination (i)	89.69±0.55°
Argument of periastron (ω) (secondary)	255.69±0.03°
Semi-amplitude (K_{1}) (primary)	95.82±0.05 km/s
Semi-amplitude (K_{2}) (secondary)	129.29±0.05 km/s

Details

VV Corvi A
Mass	1.970±0.009 M_{☉}
Radius	3.329±0.018 R_{☉}
Luminosity	17.8±3.3 L_{☉}
Surface gravity (log g)	3.688±0.005 cgs
Temperature	6,500±300 K
Metallicity [Fe/H]	+0.25±0.05 dex
Rotational velocity (v sin i)	81±3 km/s
Age	1.09±0.05 Gyr

VV Corvi B
Mass	1.497±0.007 M_{☉}
Radius	1.646±0.022 R_{☉}
Luminosity	4.74±0.87 L_{☉}
Surface gravity (log g)	4.180±0.012 cgs
Temperature	6,642±13 K
Metallicity [Fe/H]	+0.25±0.05 dex
Rotational velocity (v sin i)	24±2 km/s
Age	1.09±0.05 Gyr

Other designations
- BD−12°3676, HD 110317, HIP 61910, HR 4821

Database references
SIMBAD	data

VV Corvi (abbreviated as VV Crv) is an eclipsing binary in the constellation Corvus. At an apparent magnitude of 5.843, the system is faintly visible to the naked eye in regions not significantly affected by light pollution. Parallax measurements imply a distance of 266 light-years (82 parsecs).

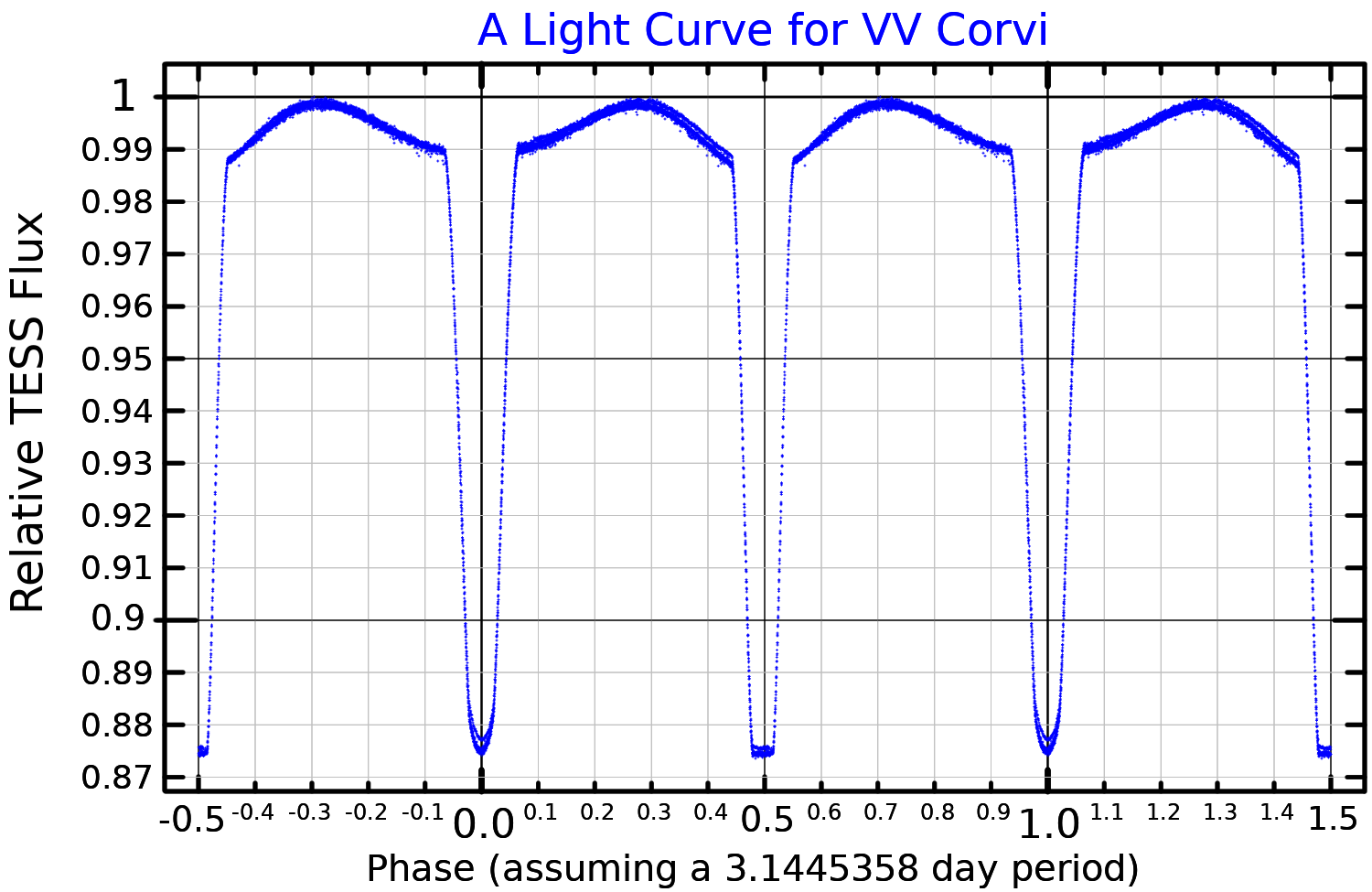
A light curve for VV Corvi, plotted from TESS data

The two stars orbit each other with an orbital period of 1.46 days and an eccentricity of 0.088. The primary is 1.98 times as massive as the Sun, has 3.375 the Sun's radius and 18 its luminosity. The secondary is 1.513 times as massive as the Sun, has 1.650 the Sun's radius and 4.745 times its luminosity. Both are F-type main-sequence stars of spectral type F5V, though the primary has begun expanding and cooling as it nears the end of its time on the main sequence. A tertiary companion was discovered during the Two Micron All-Sky Survey.

VV Corvi makes part of a multiple star system. It is the secondary component of the sextuple (Note: While classified as a quintuple in Fekel et al. 2013, with BD-12°3675 being only a candidate member, BD-12°3675 was included in Tokovinin's Multiple Star Catalog.) star system ADS 8627, whose primary member is HR 4822, a magnitude 5.98 star separated by 5.24" from VV Corvi, which at the system's distance implies a projected separation of 416 astronomical units and an orbital period around 3,500 years. HR 4822 is itself a triple star system. The third component, separated by 59.5" from the primary and secondary, is BD-12°3675, a magnitude 10.28 star.
