= RV Corvi =

Binary star system in the constellation Corvus

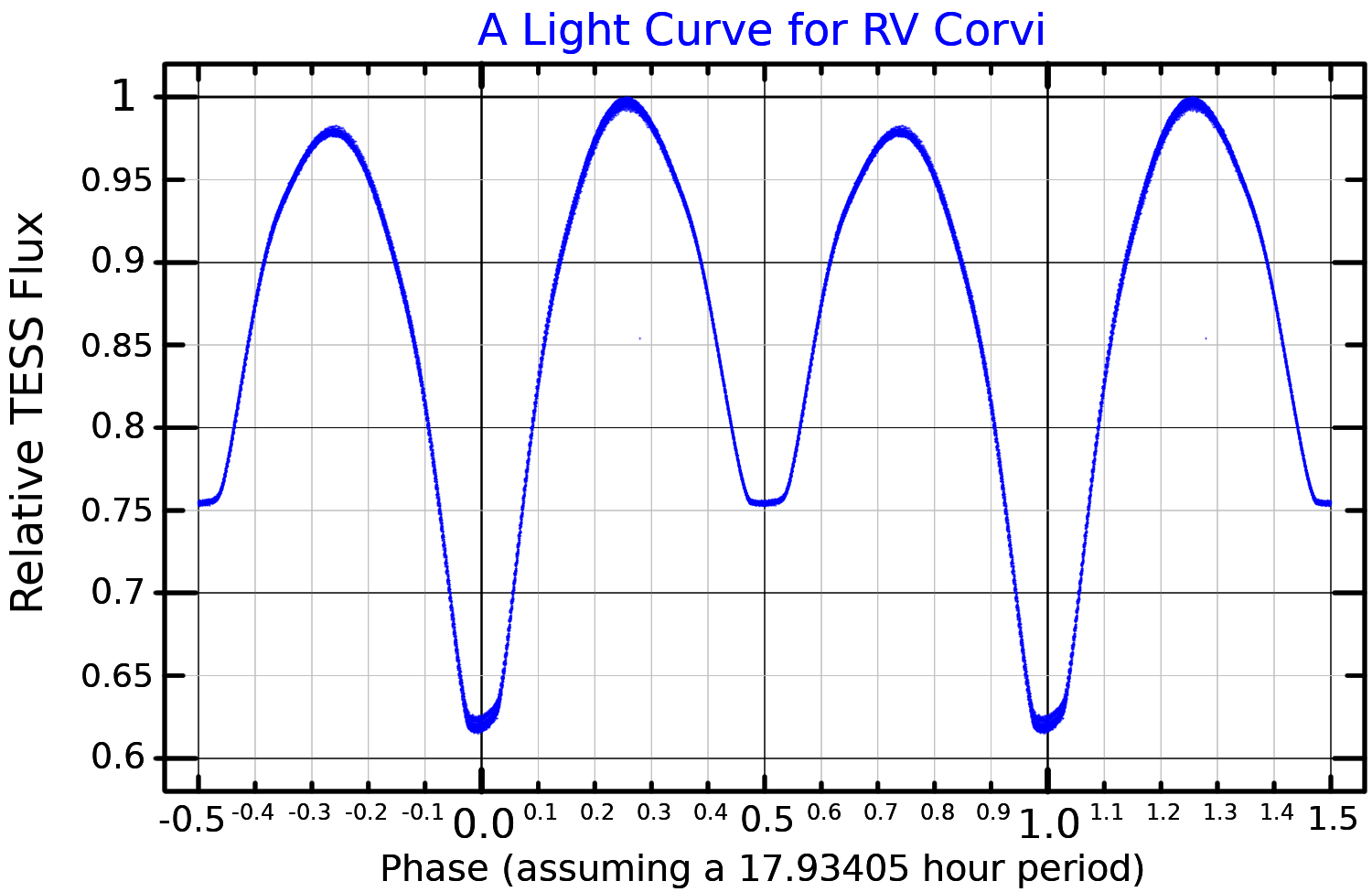
- A light curve for RV Corvi, plotted from TESS data

Observation data Epoch J2000.0 Equinox ICRS
- Constellation: Corvus
- Right ascension: 12^{h} 37^{m} 40.711^{s}
- Declination: −19° 34′ 40.03″
- Apparent magnitude (V): 8.6 - 9.16

Characteristics
- Evolutionary stage: Main sequence
- Spectral type: F0V (F0 + G0)
- B−V color index: 0.404±0.026
- Variable type: β Lyr

Astrometry
Radial velocity (R_{v})	19.0±4.6 km/s
Proper motion (μ)	RA: −29.326 mas/yr Dec.: +8.954 mas/yr
Parallax (π)	4.7351±0.0812 mas
Distance	690 ± 10 ly (211 ± 4 pc)
Absolute magnitude (M_{V})	2.32

Orbit
Period (P)	0.7473 d
Eccentricity (e)	0.00
Periastron epoch (T)	2445792.3578
Argument of periastron (ω) (secondary)	0.00°
Semi-amplitude (K_{1}) (primary)	64 km/s
Semi-amplitude (K_{2}) (secondary)	235 km/s

Details

Primary
Mass	1.64±0.14 M_{☉}
Radius	2.16 or 2.18±0.08 R_{☉}
Luminosity	8.4 or 8.5 ± 0.6 L_{☉}

Secondary
Mass	0.44±0.03 M_{☉}
Radius	1.19 or 1.20±0.04 R_{☉}
Luminosity	1.2 or 1.5±0.1 L_{☉}

Other designations
- RV Crv, BD−18°3431, HD 109796, HIP 61620

Database references
SIMBAD	data

RV Corvi is an eclipsing binary star system in the southern constellation of Corvus. The brightness of the pair regularly ranges in apparent visual magnitude from 8.6 down to 9.16 over a period 18 hours, even the brightest of which is too faint to be visible to the naked eye. The system is located at a distance of approximately 690 light-years from the Sun based on parallax measurements, and is drifting further away with a radial velocity of ~19 km/s.

The variability of this system was discovered by H. H. Swope. In 1942, Irene G. Buttery published an orbital period of 0.74728 days for the system, showing this is an eclipsing binary. It is a near-contact binary with both stars showing the effect of tidal interactions and the facing sides are less than 10% of the orbital separation apart, but are not in contact. One or both stars may show an excess of luminosity on their facing sides. The system is composed of stars of spectral types F0 and G0, which orbit each other every 0.7473 days.
