= W Corvi =

Eclipsing stellar binary

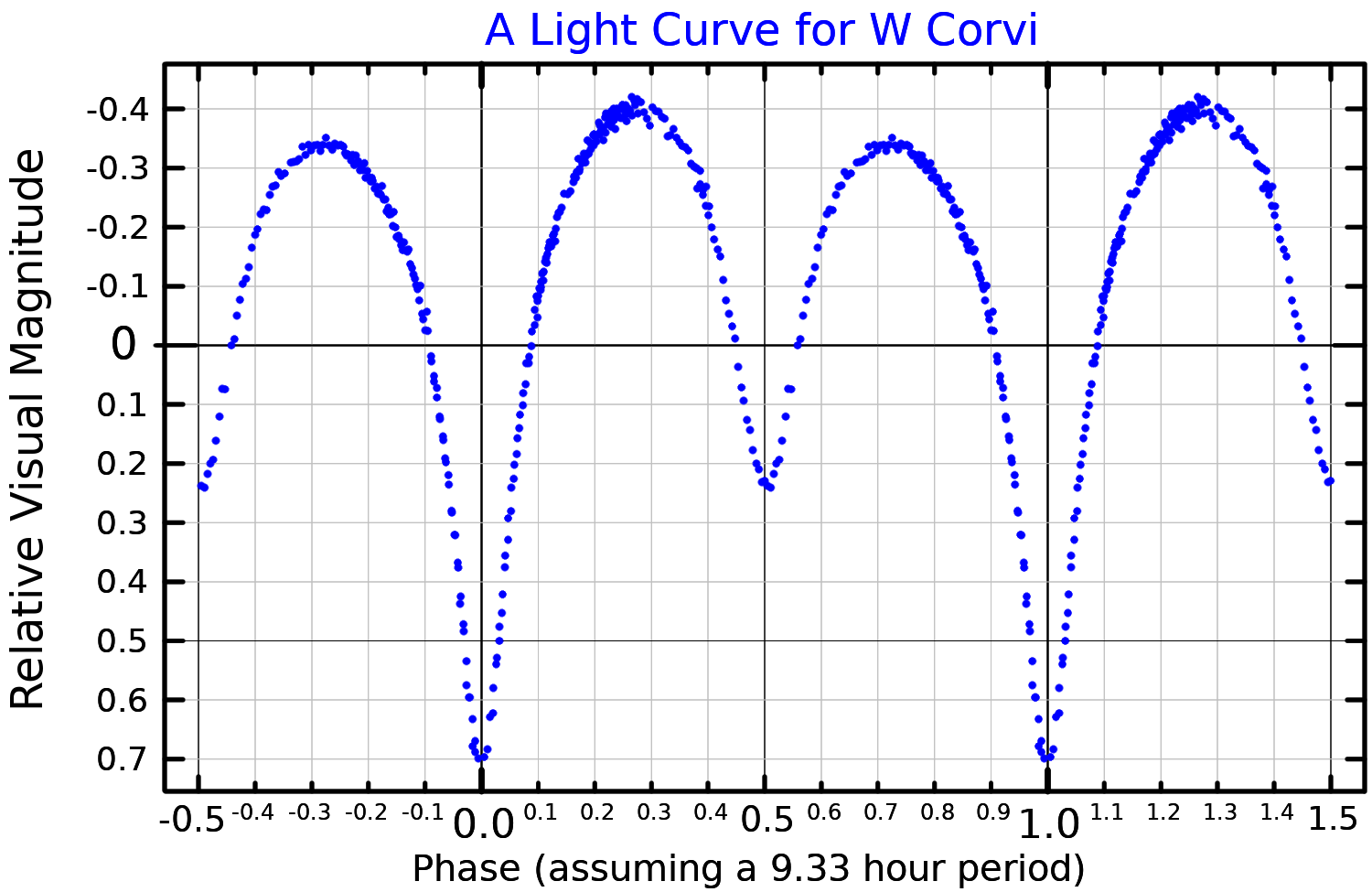
- A visual band light curve for W Corvi, adapted from Odell and Cushing (2004)

Observation data Epoch J2000.0 Equinox J2000.0
- Constellation: Corvus
- Right ascension: 12^{h} 07^{m} 34.360^{s}
- Declination: −13° 08′ 59.02″
- Apparent magnitude (V): 11.16 - 12.5

Characteristics
- Evolutionary stage: Beta Lyrae variable
- Spectral type: G-

Astrometry
Proper motion (μ)	RA: −18.8±2.1 mas/yr Dec.: +18.2±2.1 mas/yr

Details

Other designations
- W Corvi, BD−12°3565

Database references
SIMBAD	data

W Corvi is an eclipsing binary star system in the constellation Corvus, ranging from apparent magnitude 11.16 to 12.5 over 9 hours. Its period has increased by 1/4 second over a century. It is an unusual system in that its two stars are very close to each other yet have different surface temperatures and hence thermal transfer is not taking place as expected.
