= TT Corvi =

Variable star in the constellation Corvus

Observation data Epoch J2000.0 Equinox ICRS
- Constellation: Corvus
- Right ascension: 12^{h} 23^{m} 18.867^{s}
- Declination: −11° 48′ 43.63″
- Apparent magnitude (V): 6.47 to 6.57

Characteristics
- Evolutionary stage: AGB
- Spectral type: M3III
- Variable type: semiregular

Astrometry
Radial velocity (R_{v})	−0.17±0.15 km/s
Proper motion (μ)	RA: −51.390 mas/yr Dec.: −10.877 mas/yr
Parallax (π)	3.2721±0.0484 mas
Distance	1,000 ± 10 ly (306 ± 5 pc)
Absolute magnitude (M_{V})	−0.75

Details
Mass	1.7 M_{☉}
Radius	80 R_{☉}
Luminosity	859 L_{☉}
Surface gravity (log g)	1.39 cgs
Temperature	3,606 K
Age	287 Myr

Other designations
- TT Crv, HD 107814, HIP 60421

Database references
SIMBAD	data

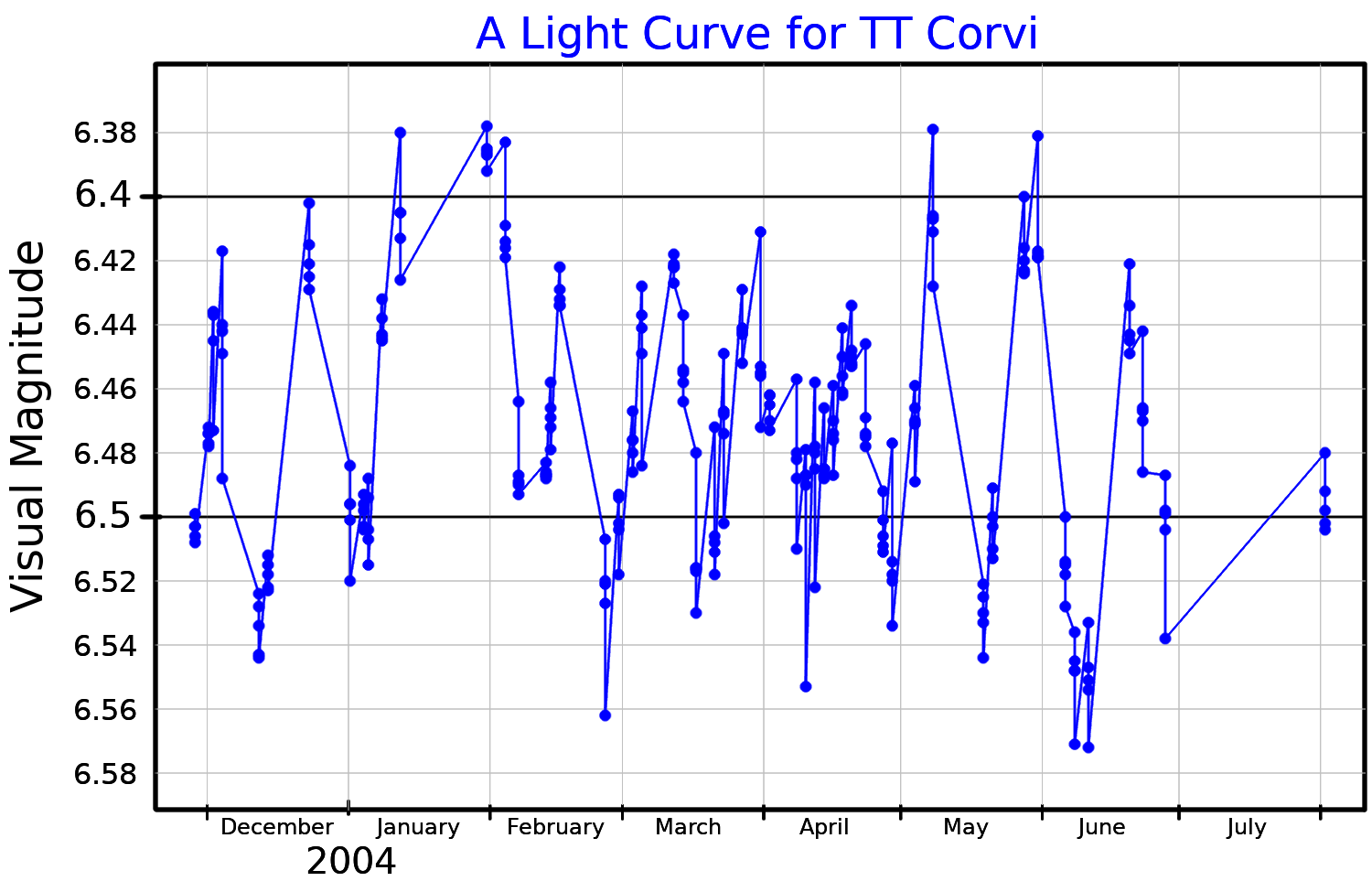
A visual band light curve for TT Corvi, plotted from ASAS data

TT Corvi (TT Crv) is a semiregular variable star in the constellation Corvus. It is a red giant of spectral type M3III and average apparent magnitude 6.48 around 923 light years distant. It shines with a luminosity approximately 993 times that of the Sun and has a surface temperature of 3,630 K.
