= 6 Corvi =

Star in the constellation Corvus

Observation data Epoch J2000.0 Equinox ICRS
- Constellation: Corvus
- Right ascension: 12^{h} 23^{m} 21.58766^{s}
- Declination: −24° 50′ 26.4076″
- Apparent magnitude (V): 5.66

Characteristics
- Evolutionary stage: giant
- Spectral type: K1 III
- B−V color index: 1.153±0.005

Astrometry
Radial velocity (R_{v})	−2.42±0.15 km/s
Proper motion (μ)	RA: −19.328 mas/yr Dec.: −20.650 mas/yr
Parallax (π)	9.5644±0.1116 mas
Distance	341 ± 4 ly (105 ± 1 pc)
Absolute magnitude (M_{V})	0.63

Details
Mass	1.57 M_{☉}
Radius	13.8 R_{☉}
Luminosity	69 L_{☉}
Surface gravity (log g)	2.88 cgs
Temperature	5,200 K
Metallicity [Fe/H]	0.02 dex
Rotational velocity (v sin i)	4.17 km/s

Other designations
- 6 Crv, CD−24°10314, HD 107815, HIP 60425, HR 4711, SAO 180747

Database references
SIMBAD	data

6 Corvi is a single star in the southern constellation of Corvus, located 341 light years away from the Sun. It is visible to the naked eye as a faint, orange-hued star with an apparent visual magnitude of 5.66. This object is moving closer to the Earth with a heliocentric radial velocity of −2.4 km/s. It is an evolved giant star with a stellar classification of K1 III. The star has expanded to 13.8 times the Sun's radius and is radiating 69 times the luminosity of the Sun from its enlarged photosphere at an effective temperature of 5,200 K.
