= Eta Corvi =

Star in the constellation of Corvus

- Location of η Corvi (circled)

Observation data Epoch J2000.0 Equinox J2000.0 (ICRS)
- Constellation: Corvus
- Right ascension: 12^{h} 32^{m} 04.22640^{s}
- Declination: −16° 11′ 45.6186″
- Apparent magnitude (V): 4.29–4.32

Characteristics
- Evolutionary stage: Main sequence
- Spectral type: F2 V
- U−B color index: +0.00
- B−V color index: +0.38
- R−I color index: +0.18
- Variable type: Suspected

Astrometry
Radial velocity (R_{v})	−1.164±0.135 km/s
Proper motion (μ)	RA: −424.597±0.168 mas/yr Dec.: −58.241±0.157 mas/yr
Parallax (π)	54.8135±0.1562 mas
Distance	59.5 ± 0.2 ly (18.24 ± 0.05 pc)
Absolute magnitude (M_{V})	2.99

Details
Mass	1.41±0.05 M_{☉}
Radius	1.61±0.03 R_{☉}
Luminosity	5.05+0.25 −0.26 L_{☉}
Surface gravity (log g)	4.24 cgs
Temperature	6,823+60 −55 K
Metallicity [Fe/H]	−0.06±0.04 dex
Rotational velocity (v sin i)	68±2 km/s
Age	1.57+0.46 −0.36 Gyr

Other designations
- η Crv, 8 Crv, NSV 5690, BD−15°3489, GC 17087, GJ 471.2, GJ 9411, HD 109085, HIP 61174, HR 4775, SAO 157345, PPM 225971, LTT 4755, NLTT 31021

Database references
SIMBAD	data
ARICNS	data

Eta Corvi is an F-type main-sequence star, the sixth-brightest star in the constellation of Corvus. It is located 59.5 light-years (18.2 parsecs) from the Sun based on its parallax. The star is faintly visible to the naked eye, at an apparent magnitude of +4.3. Two debris disks have been detected orbiting this star: a cold outer disk at ~150 AU, and a warm/hot inner disk within a few astronomical units (AU). The inner disk is notable for being brighter than expected, suggesting that it is replenished by materials from the outer disk.

== Nomenclature ==
η Corvi (Latinised to Eta Corvi) is the star's Bayer designation, abbreviated Eta Crv or η Crv. It is also often referred by its Henry Draper Catalogue designation HD 109085.

In Chinese astronomy, Eta Corvi is called 左轄, Pinyin: Zuǒxiá, meaning Left Linchpin, because this star is marking itself and stands alone in the Left Linchpin asterism, Chariot mansion (see: Chinese constellation). This was transliterated as Tso Hea by R. H. Allen, but was listed as a name for β Corvi (Kraz).

== Properties ==
A yellow-white main sequence star of spectral type F2V, Eta Corvi has an estimated surface temperature of 6823 K. It is about 1.4 times as massive as the Sun and 5 times as luminous. The concentration of iron and other heavy elements in its atmosphere is approximately 90% that of the Sun's. The projected rotational velocity at the star's equator (v sin i) is 68 km/s – more than 30 times faster than that for the Sun. It is about 30% of the Sun's age.

== Debris disk ==
The Eta Corvi planetary system
Companion (in order from star)	Mass	Semimajor axis (AU)	Orbital period (years)	Eccentricity	Inclination (°)	Radius
Inner disk	6.4±2.7 AU				—	—
Outer disk	127–180 AU				39+1 −1°	—

=== Debris disks ===
Image of the debris disk with the REASONS survey

Eta Corvi possesses two dust disks. The cold outer disk is located at 150 au, is 50 au wide, and is inclined at 40° from face-on orientation. The warm inner disk is located within a few au of the star. The temperature of the cold dust is around 40 K, while the temperature of the warm dust is 300–400 K.

Excess dust surrounding Eta Corvi was first identified by the IRAS satellite through detection of an excess of infrared radiation from the star. Spectral energy distribution data suggested the presence of dust populations with different temperatures. The dust was first directly imaged in 2005, revealing a ring of cold dust with a radius of about 150 au, and a relatively empty inner cavity within 100 au possibly cleared by a planetary system, a result supported by subsequent submillimetre observation attempts. The warm dust component was found to likely reside within a few au of the star.

The dust within the outer disk cannot be primordial, as collisions between dust grains would break them into sufficiently small grains that can then be removed by radiation pressure. This suggests the dust is constantly replenished by collisional cascade, where collisions between planetesimals break large bodies into objects of various sizes, including dust. The inferred initial total planetesimal mass is around 20 Earth masses (M_{🜨}).

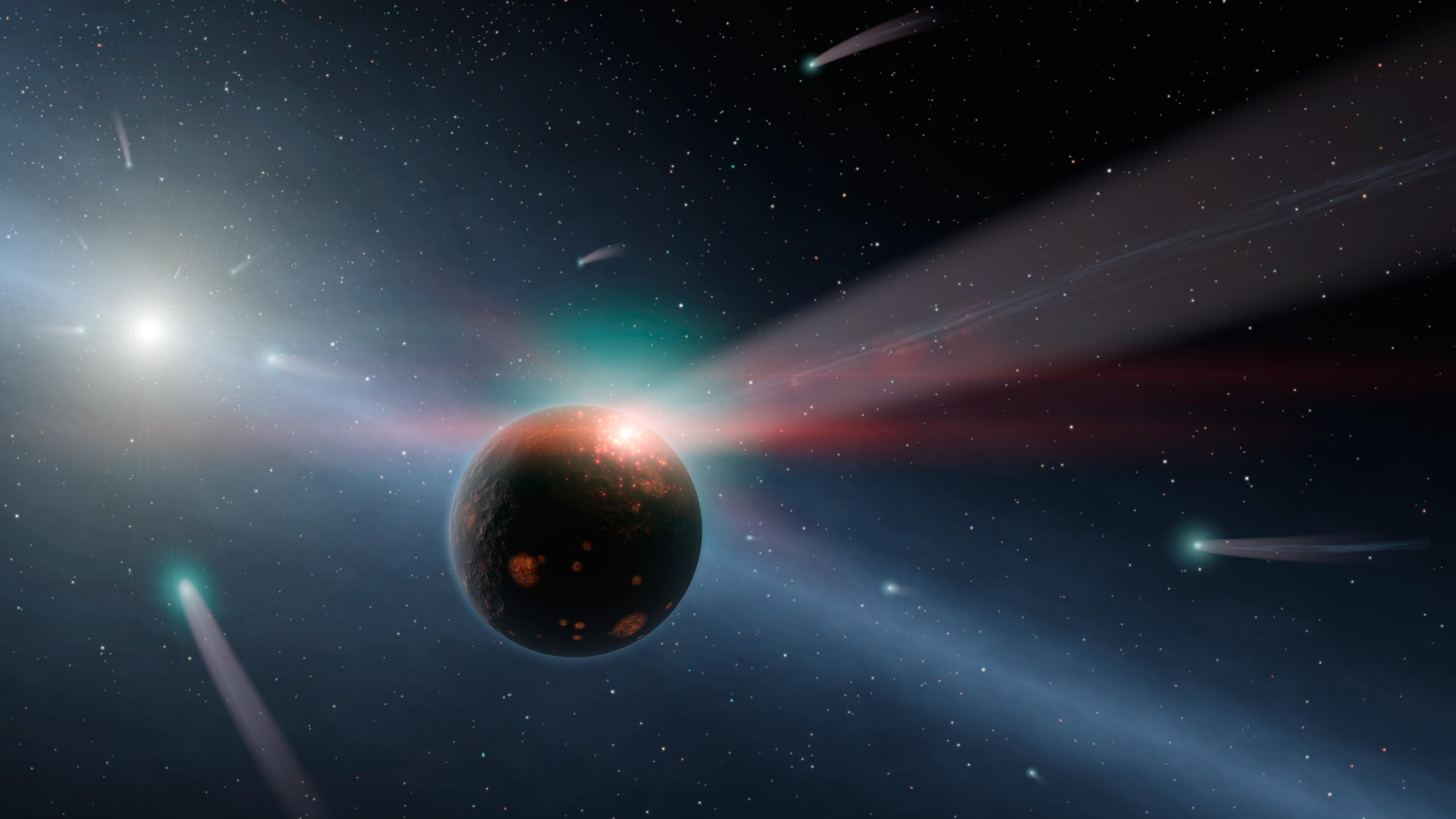
Artist's conception of a storm of comets in the Eta Corvi system, with a possible planet

The warm dust disk component around Eta Corvi is notable for being more luminous than the maximum theoretical luminosity of the disk, derived from collisions between planetesimals formed within the disk itself. Additionally, the composition of the warm dust appears to resemble cometary materials, with primitive silicates not processed by aqueous alteration, as well as carbon-bearing species and water. Evidence of silica dust has also been detected, indicating high velocity collisions on the order of 5–10 km/s. These may hence be explained by an influx of planetesimals from a reservoir in the outer system migrating into the inner system before being destroyed by collisions, producing the observed dust. The warm dust emission appears to remain stable over 30 years, suggesting that the inner disk is efficiently replenished. The transport of outer disk planetesimals to the inner system may involve a steady state configuration of planets scattering materials inwards, or a one-off event analogous to the Late Heavy Bombardment (LHB) involving instability between planets. Observations of the outer disk favors the steady state model, as an LHB-like instability would have resulted in a broader outer disk.

The debris disks of Eta Corvi has been imaged by the James Webb Space Telescope (JWST) on 20 May 2025. The results have been presented at the 247th Meeting of the American Astronomical Society, the 25.5 micrometre imaging revealing a much more compact disk than the outer disk, possibly suggesting a quiet collisional history in the outer disk itself. As of March 2026, these results have not yet been published.

=== Planets ===
Currently, no planet around Eta Corvi has been detected. Radial velocity measurements have ruled out companions with masses down to 6 Jupiter masses (M_{J}) orbiting within 2000 days (~3 au).

Several papers have made predictions of planets based on the distribution of dust disks in the system. The transportation of planetesimals into the inner system may require one or more perturbing planets, and there may also be an inner planet struck by the planetesimals to produce the observed warm dust. Lisse et al. (2012) predicted a migrating giant planet orbiting at 100–150 au, and a rocky planet less massive than Earth based on impact velocity and escape velocity constraints. Marino et al. (2016) proposed either a low-mass planet embedded within the outer disk, a single perturber orbiting near the disk's inner edge, or a chain of planets with masses between 3–30 M_{🜨}, and in the case that the warm dust is produced by impacts on a planet, the paper predicted a 4–10 M_{🜨} planet based on production of sufficient debris to remain detectable over long time. Pearce et al. (2022) predicted a single planet sculpting the debris disk with a mass of ≥0.34 M_{J} at 104 au.

== See also ==
- Eta Crucis, another similar star with cold and warm dust disks
- Alpha Corvi, nearby star
