= Delta Corvi =

Star in the constellation of Corvus

- Location of δ Corvi (circled)

Observation data Epoch J2000 Equinox ICRS
- Constellation: Corvus
- Right ascension: 12^{h} 29^{m} 51.85517^{s}
- Declination: −16° 30′ 55.5525″
- Apparent magnitude (V): +2.962

Characteristics
- Spectral type: A0 IV(n) kB9
- U−B color index: −0.050
- B−V color index: −0.045

Astrometry
Radial velocity (R_{v})	+9 km/s
Proper motion (μ)	RA: −210.49 mas/yr Dec.: −138.74 mas/yr
Parallax (π)	37.55±0.16 mas
Distance	86.9 ± 0.4 ly (26.6 ± 0.1 pc)
Absolute magnitude (M_{V})	+0.2

Details
Mass	2.74+0.07 −0.06 M_{☉}
Radius	2.69±0.06 R_{☉}
Luminosity	69.0+9.7 −8.9 L_{☉}
Surface gravity (log g)	4.06±0.05 cgs
Temperature	10,400 K
Rotational velocity (v sin i)	236 km/s
Age	260+14 −24 or 3.2+0.1 −0.1 Myr

Other designations
- Algorab, δ Crv, 7 Crv, BD−15 3482, FK5 465, HD 108767, HIP 60965, HR 4757, SAO 157323

Database references
SIMBAD	data

Delta Corvi is a star in the southern constellation of Corvus. It has the proper name Algorab, pronounced /ˈælɡəræb/; Delta Corvi is its Bayer designation. With an apparent visual magnitude of +2.962, this star is visible to the naked eye. Based on parallax measurements, it is located at a distance of 86.9 light-years (26.6 parsecs) from the Sun The star is receding with a line of sight velocity component of +9 km/s.

== Nomenclature ==
δ Corvi (Latinised to Delta Corvi) is the star's Bayer designation, which is abbreviated Delta Crv or δ Crv.

It bore the traditional name Algorab derived from Arabic الغراب al-ghuraab, meaning 'the crow'. In 2016, the International Astronomical Union organized a Working Group on Star Names (WGSN) to catalog and standardize proper names for stars. The WGSN's first bulletin of July 2016 included a table of the first two batches of names approved by the WGSN; which included Algorab for this star.

In Chinese, 軫宿 (Zhěn Sù), meaning Chariot, refers to an asterism consisting of Delta Corvi, Gamma Corvi, Epsilon Corvi and Beta Corvi. Consequently, Delta Corvi itself is known as 軫宿三 (Zhěn Sù sān, English: the Third Star of Chariot).

== Stellar properties ==
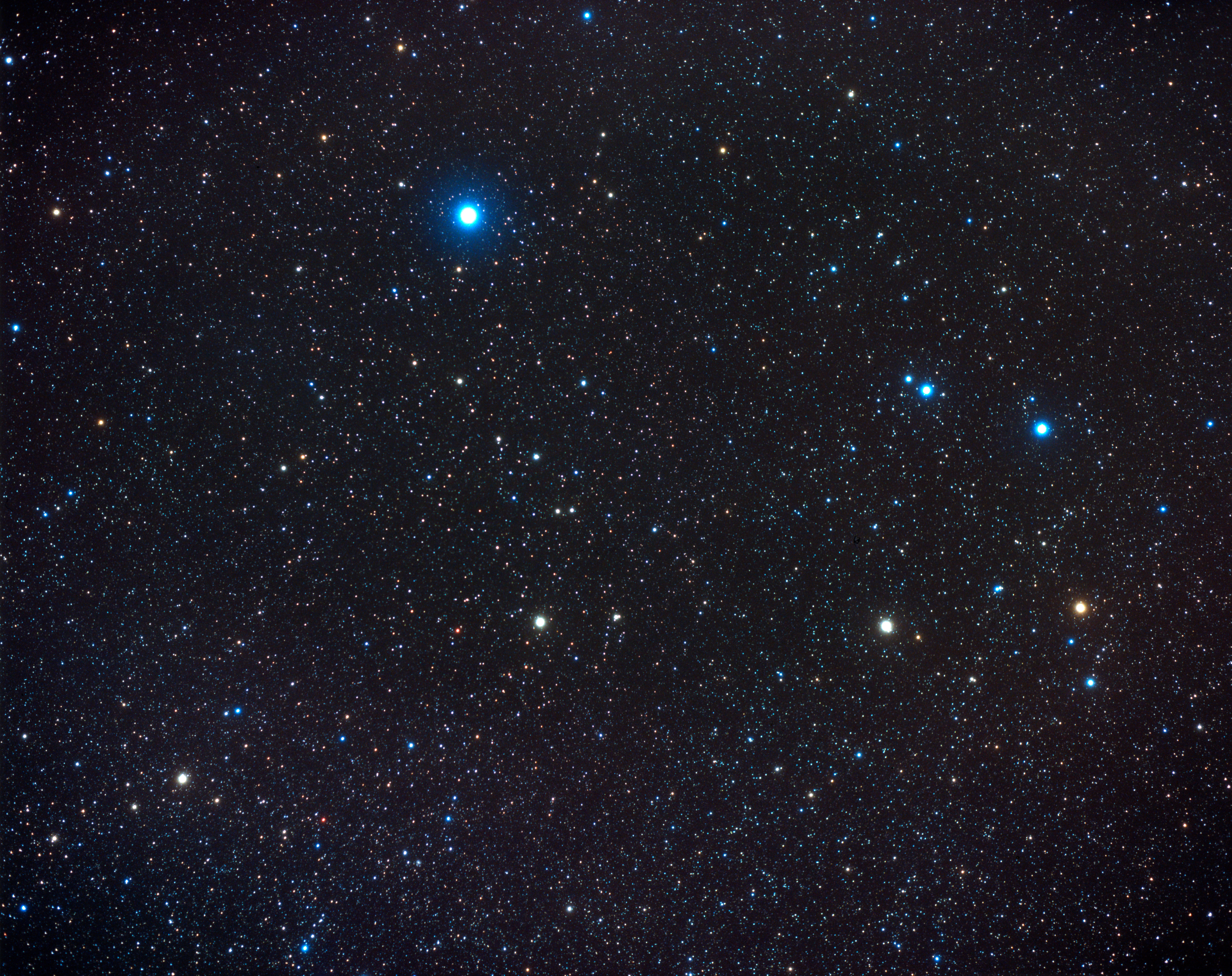
Wide angle photo of the constellation Corvus and part of constellation Hydra, with δ at top left of the parallelogram

Delta Corvi has more than 2.7 times the mass of the Sun, which is causing it to radiate a much higher energy output—roughly 69 times the Sun's luminosity. The effective temperature of the outer atmosphere is 10,400 K, giving it the white hue of an A-type star. The spectrum matches a stellar classification of A0 IV(n) kB9. However, it is more luminous—65 to 70 times that of the Sun—than it would be if it were on the main sequence. Hence it is either a subgiant star around 260 million years old that has nearly exhausted the supply of hydrogen at its core and is in the process of evolving away from the main sequence of stars like the Sun, or a pre-main-sequence star around 3.2 million years old that has not completely condensed and settled on the main sequence.

In 1823, Delta Corvi was found to be a wide double star by British astronomers James South and John Herschel. Since that time, the position of the two stars with respect to each other has not changed. The magnitude 9.3 companion, HR 4757 B, with a classification of K2Ve, is at an angular separation of 24.2 arcseconds along a position angle of 214°. Although the two stars share a common proper motion, the significant differences in their estimated ages suggests that they may not be physically connected.

A 2006 study found that Delta Corvi displayed no excess infrared emission that would otherwise suggest the presence of circumstellar matter; however, warm interstellar dust was detected in a 2014 study.

Delta Corvi may be a binary star system. There is a star that shares a similar proper motion and thus is believed to be gravitationally bound. This possible companion has a projected separation of 640 astronomical units and around 0.7 times the mass and 0.8 times the radius of the Sun.

== In culture ==
USS Algorab (AKA-8) was a United States Navy ship named after the star.

Algorab is one of the Behenian fixed stars.
