= Chariot (Chinese constellation) =

Mansion in Chinese astronomy

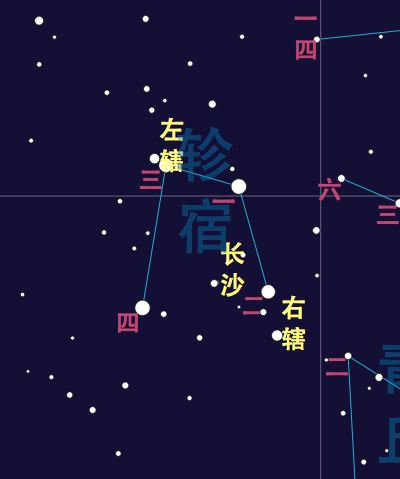
Zhěn Xiù map

The Chariot mansion (simplified Chinese: 轸宿; traditional Chinese: 軫宿; pinyin: Zhěn Xiù) is one of the Twenty-Eight Mansions of the Chinese constellations. It is one of the southern mansions of the Vermilion Bird.

== Asterisms ==
English name	Chinese name	European constellation	Number of stars
Chariot	軫	Corvus	4
Changsha	長沙	Corvus	1
Left Linchpin	左轄	Corvus	1
Right Linchpin	右轄	Corvus	1
Green Hill	青丘	Hydra	7
Military Gate	軍門	Hydra	2
Master of Constructions	土司空	Hydra	4
House for Musical Instruments	器府	Centaurus	32
