= Beta Corvi =

Star in the constellation of Corvus

β Corvi
- Location of β Corvi (circled in red)

Observation data Epoch J2000 Equinox ICRS
- Constellation: Corvus
- Right ascension: 12^{h} 34^{m} 23.23484^{s}
- Declination: −23° 23′ 48.3374″
- Apparent magnitude (V): 2.647

Characteristics
- Spectral type: G5 II
- U−B color index: +0.586
- B−V color index: +0.898
- R−I color index: +0.44
- Variable type: suspected

Astrometry
Radial velocity (R_{v})	−7.34±0.08 km/s
Proper motion (μ)	RA: +1.11 mas/yr Dec.: −56.56 mas/yr
Parallax (π)	22.39±0.18 mas
Distance	146 ± 1 ly (44.7 ± 0.4 pc)
Absolute magnitude (M_{V})	−0.651±0.033

Details
Mass	3.32±0.06 M_{☉}
Radius	15.84±0.72 R_{☉}
Luminosity	175+13 −12 L_{☉}
Surface gravity (log g)	2.86±0.06 cgs
Temperature	5,325±28 K
Metallicity [Fe/H]	0.14±0.02 dex
Rotational velocity (v sin i)	2.58±0.55 km/s
Age	280±10 Myr

Other designations
- Kraz, β Crv, Beta Corvi, Beta Crv, 9 Corvi, 9 Crv, BD−22 3401, CD−22 3401, CD−22 9505, CPD−22 5388, FK5 471, GC 17133, HD 109379, HIP 61359, HR 4786, SAO 180915, PPM 260512

Database references
SIMBAD	data

Beta Corvi is a star in the southern constellation of Corvus. It has the proper name Kraz, pronounced /ˈkræz/; Beta Corvi or β Corvi is its Bayer designation. With an apparent visual magnitude of 2.647, it is visible to the naked eye as the second-brightest star in Corvus. Based on parallax measurements obtained during the Hipparcos mission, it is about 146 light-years (45 parsecs) distant from the Sun. This star is drifting closer with a line of sight velocity component of −7.3 km/s.

== Nomenclature ==
β Corvi, which is Latinised to Beta Corvi and abbreviated Beta Crv or β Crv, is the star's Bayer designation.

In a 1951 publication, Atlas Coeli (Skalnate Pleso Atlas of the Heavens) by Czech astronomer Antonín Bečvář, it bore the name Kraz, whose origin and meaning remain unknown.

In 2016, the IAU organized a Working Group on Star Names (WGSN) to catalog and standardize proper names for stars. The WGSN approved the name Kraz for this star on 1 June 2018 and it is now so included in the List of IAU-approved Star Names.

In Chinese, 軫宿 (Zhěn Sù), meaning Chariot (asterism), refers to an asterism consisting of Beta, Gamma, Epsilon and Delta Corvi. Consequently, Beta Corvi itself is known as 軫宿四 (Zhěn Sù sì, English: the Fourth Star of Chariot).

== Properties ==
Beta Corvi has about 3.3 times the Sun's mass and is roughly 300 million years old, which is old enough for a star of this mass to consume the hydrogen at its core and evolve away from the main sequence. The stellar classification is G5 II, with the luminosity class of 'II' indicating this is a bright giant. The effective temperature of the star's outer envelope is about 5,325 K, which produces a yellow hue common to G-type stars.

Currently, Beta Corvi has expanded to 15.8 times the Sun's size and is emitting about 175 times the luminosity of the Sun. The abundance of elements other than hydrogen or helium, what astronomers term metallicity, is 1.38 times that of the Sun. (Note: The abundance is estimated by taking [Fe/H] to the power of ten: 10^{[Fe/H]} = 10^{+0.14} = 1.38)

This is a suspected variable star of unknown type that ranges in apparent visual magnitude from a low of 2.66 to a high of 2.60.

== See also ==
- List of stars in Corvus
- Beta Leporis, another bright giant star with similar size and spectral type
