= Corvus (constellation) =

Constellation in the Southern Celestial Hemisphere

- Constellation
- List of stars in Corvus
- Abbreviation: Crv
- Genitive: Corvi
- Pronunciation: /ˈkɔːrvəs/, genitive /ˈkɔːrvaɪ/
- Symbolism: the Crow/Raven
- Right ascension: 12^{h}
- Declination: −20°
- Area: 184 sq. deg. (70th)
- Main stars: 4
- Bayer/Flamsteed stars: 10
- Stars brighter than 3.00^{m}: 3
- Stars within 10.00 pc (32.62 ly): 1
- Brightest star: γ Crv (Gienah) (2.59^{m})
- Nearest star: Ross 695
- Messier objects: 0
- Meteor showers: Corvids; Eta Corvids
- Bordering constellations: Virgo; Crater; Hydra
- Visible at latitudes between +60° and −90°. Best visible at 21:00 (9 p.m.) during the month of May.

Corvus is a small constellation in the Southern Celestial Hemisphere. Its name means "raven" in Latin. One of the 48 constellations listed by the 2nd-century astronomer Ptolemy, it depicts a raven, a bird associated with stories about the god Apollo, perched on the back of Hydra the water snake. The four brightest stars, Gamma, Delta, Epsilon, and Beta Corvi, form a distinctive quadrilateral or cross-shape in the night sky.

With an apparent magnitude of 2.59, Gamma Corvi—also known as Gienah—is the brightest star in the constellation. It is an aging blue giant around four times as massive as the Sun. The young star Eta Corvi has been found to have two debris disks. Three star systems have exoplanets, and a fourth planetary system is unconfirmed. TV Corvi is a dwarf nova—a white dwarf and brown dwarf in very close orbit.

== History and mythology ==
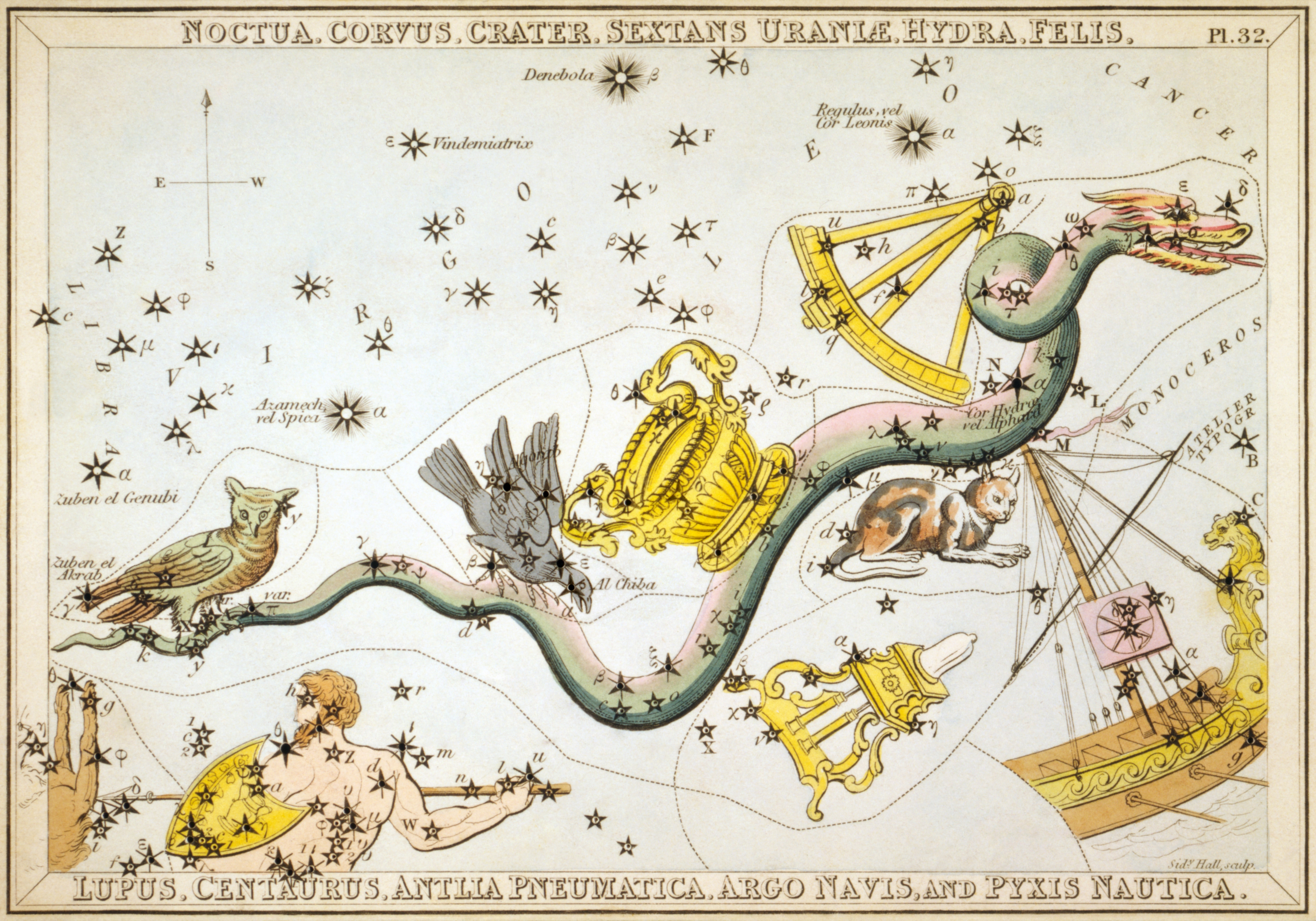
Corvus, Crater, and other constellations seen around Hydra in Urania's Mirror (1825)

In the Babylonian star catalogues dating from at least 1100 BCE, what later became known as Corvus was called the Raven (MUL.UGA.MUSHEN). As with more familiar Classical astronomy, it was placed sitting on the tail of the Serpent (Greek Hydra). The Babylonian constellation was sacred to Adad, the god of rain and storm; in the second Millennium BCE it would have risen just before the autumnal rainy season. John H. Rogers observed that Hydra signified Ningishzida, the god of the underworld in the Babylonian compendium MUL.APIN. He proposed that Corvus and Crater (along with Hydra) were death symbols and marked the gate to the underworld. These two constellations, along with the eagle Aquila and the fish Piscis Austrinus, were introduced to the Greeks around 500 BCE; they marked the winter and summer solstices respectively. Furthermore, Hydra had been a landmark as it had straddled the celestial equator in antiquity. Corvus and Crater also featured in the iconography of Mithraism, which is thought to have been of middle-eastern origin before spreading into Ancient Greece and Rome.

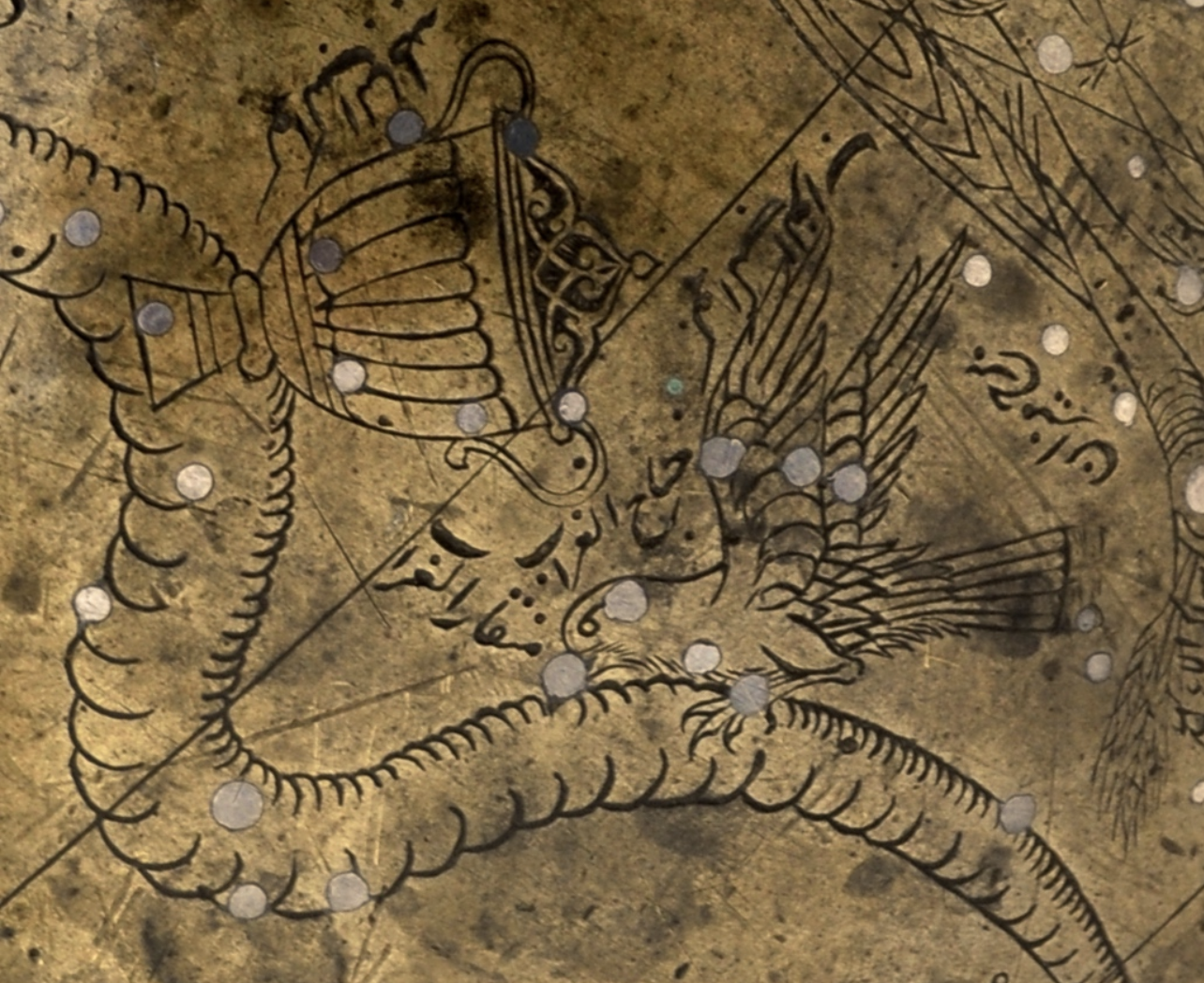
Corvus as depicted on The Manuchihr Globe made in Mashhad 1632-33 AD. Adilnor Collection, Sweden.

Corvus is associated with the myth of Apollo and his lover Coronis the Lapith. Coronis had been unfaithful to Apollo; when he learned this information from a pure white crow (or raven in some versions, called Lycius), he turned its feathers black in a fit of rage. Another legend associated with Corvus is that a crow stopped on his way to fetch water for Apollo, to eat figs. Instead of telling the truth to Apollo, he lied and said that a snake, Hydra, kept him from the water, while holding a snake in his talons as proof. Apollo, realizing this was a lie, flung the crow (Corvus), cup (Crater), and snake (Hydra) into the sky. He further punished the wayward bird by ensuring it would forever be thirsty, both in real life and in the heavens, where the Cup is just out of reach.

=== In non-Western astronomy ===
In Chinese astronomy, the stars of Corvus are located within the Vermilion Bird of the South (南方朱雀, Nán Fāng Zhū Què). The four main stars depict a chariot, Zhen, which is the 28th and final lunar mansion; Alpha and Eta mark the linchpins for the wheels, and Zeta is Changsha, a coffin. In Indian astronomy, the five main stars of Corvus represent a hand or fist corresponding to the Hasta, the 13th nakshatra or lunar mansion.

Corvus was recognized as a constellation by several Polynesian cultures and used as a guide for ocean navigation. In the Marquesas Islands, it was called Mee; in Pukapuka, it was called Te Manu, and in the Society Islands, it was called Metua-ai-papa. To Torres Strait Islanders, Corvus was the right hand (holding kupa fruit) of the huge constellation Tagai, a man fishing.

The Bororo people of Mato Grosso in central Brazil regarded the constellation as a land tortoise Geriguigui, while the Tucano people of the northwestern Amazon region saw it as an egret. To the Tupi people of São Luís Island in Brazil, Corvus might have been seen as a grill or barbecue—seychouioura, on which fish were grilled. The depiction could have also referred to the Great Square of Pegasus.

== Characteristics ==
Covering 184 square degrees and hence 0.446% of the sky, Corvus ranks 70th of the 88 constellations in area. It is bordered by Virgo to the north and east, Hydra to the south, and Crater to the west. The three-letter abbreviation for the constellation, as adopted by the International Astronomical Union in 1922, is "Crv". The official constellation boundaries, as set by Belgian astronomer Eugène Delporte in 1930, (Note: Delporte had proposed standardizing the constellation boundaries to the International Astronomical Union, who had agreed and gave him the lead role.) are defined by a polygon of six segments (illustrated in infobox). In the equatorial coordinate system, the right ascension coordinates of these borders lie between 11^{h} 56^{m} 22^{s} and 12^{h} 56^{m} 40^{s}, while the declination coordinates are between −11.68° and −25.20°. Its position in the Southern Celestial Hemisphere means that the whole constellation is visible to observers south of 65°N. (Note: While parts of the constellation technically rise above the horizon to observers between the 65°N and 78°N, stars within a few degrees of the horizon are to all intents and purposes unobservable.)

== Features ==
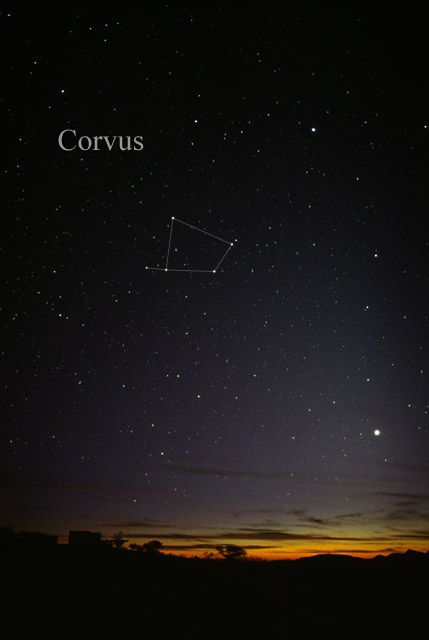
The constellation Corvus as it can be seen by the naked eye

=== Stars ===
The German cartographer Johann Bayer used the Greek letters Alpha through Eta to label the most prominent stars in the constellation. John Flamsteed gave nine stars Flamsteed designations, while one star he designated in the neighbouring constellation Crater—31 Crateris—lay within Corvus once the constellation boundaries were established in 1930. Within the constellation's borders, there are 29 stars brighter than or equal to apparent magnitude 6.5. (Note: Objects of magnitude 6.5 are among the faintest visible to the unaided eye in suburban-rural transition night skies.)

Four principal stars, Delta, Gamma, Epsilon, and Beta Corvi, form a quadrilateral asterism known as "the "Spica's Spanker" or "the Sail". Although none of the stars are particularly bright, they lie in a dim area of the sky, rendering the asterism easy to distinguish in the night sky. Gamma and Delta serve as pointers toward Spica.

Also called Gienah, Gamma is the brightest star in Corvus at magnitude 2.59. Its traditional name means "wing", the star marking the left wing in Bayer's Uranometria. 154±1 light-years from Earth, it is a blue-white hued giant star of spectral type B8III that is 4.2+0.4
−0.3 times as massive, and 355 times as luminous as the Sun. Around 160+40
−30 million years old, it has largely exhausted its core hydrogen and begun expanding and cooling as it moves away from the main sequence. A binary star, it has a companion orange or red dwarf star of spectral type K5V to M5V that is about 0.8 times as massive as the Sun. Around 50 astronomical units (Note: The distance between the Earth and the Sun is one astronomical unit.) distant from Gamma Corvi A, it is estimated to complete an orbit in 158 years.

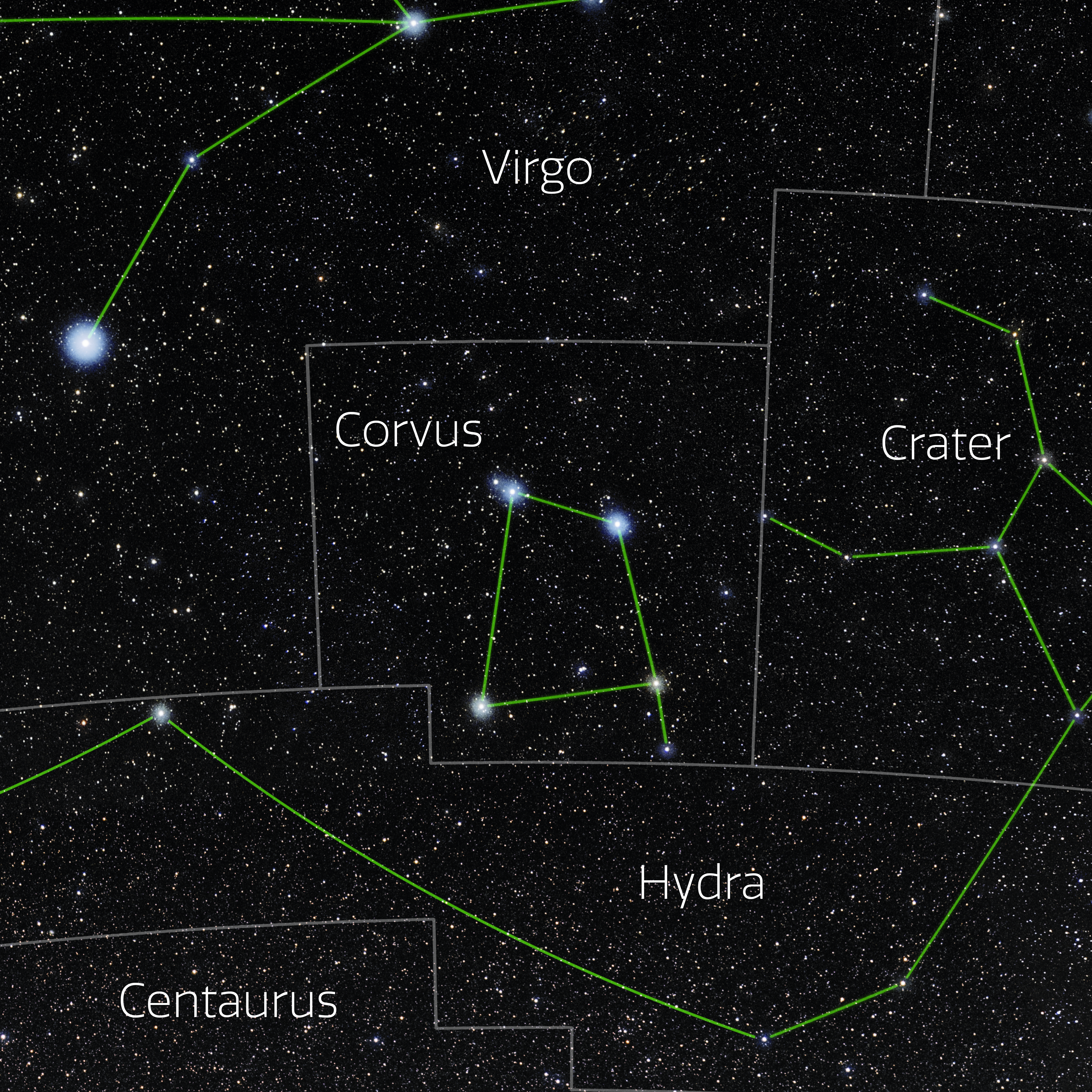
The constellation Corvus showing the IAU boundaries, the constellation stick figure, and labels for its brightest stars. Astrophotograph by Eckhard Slawik, from NOIRLab's 88 Constellations project.

Delta Corvi, traditionally called Algorab, is a double star divisible in small amateur telescopes. The primary is a blue-white star of magnitude 2.9, around 87 light-years from Earth. An enigmatic star around 2.7 times as massive as the Sun, it is more luminous (65–70 times that of the Sun) than it should be for its surface temperature of 10,400 K, and hence is either a 3.2 million year-old very young pre-main sequence star that has not settled down to a stable main sequence life stage, or a 260-million-year-old star that has begun to exhaust its core hydrogen and expand, cool and shine more brightly as it moves away from the main sequence. Its spectral type is given as A0IV, corresponding with the latter scenario. Warm circumstellar dust—by definition part of its inner stellar system—has been detected around Delta Corvi A. Delta Corvi B is an orange dwarf star of magnitude 8.51 and spectral class K, also surrounded by circumstellar dust. A post T-tauri star, it is at least 650 AU distant from its brighter companion and takes at least 9400 years to complete an orbit. Delta Corvi's common name means "the raven". It is one of two stars marking the right wing. Located 4.5 degrees northeast of Delta Corvi is Struve 1669, a binary star that is divisible into two stars 5.4" apart by small amateur telescopes, 280 light-years from Earth. The pair, both white stars, are visible to the naked eye at magnitude 5.2; the primary is of magnitude 5.9 and the secondary is of magnitude 6.0.

The raven's breast is marked by Beta Corvi (the proper name is Kraz), a star of magnitude 2.7 located 146 ± 1 light-years from Earth. Roughly 206 million years old and 3.7 ± 1 times as massive as the Sun, it has exhausted its core hydrogen and expanded and cooled to a surface temperature of around 5,100 K and is now a yellow bright giant star of spectral type G5II. It likely spent most of its existence as a blue-white main sequence star of spectral type B7V. Bearing the proper name of Minkar and marking the raven's nostril is Epsilon Corvi, located some 318 ± 5 light-years from Earth. It is a red giant of spectral type K2III that is around 54 times the Sun's radius and 930 times its luminosity. Around 4 times as massive as the Sun, it spent much of its life as a main-sequence star of spectral type B5V. Lying to the south of the quadrilateral between Beta and Epsilon Corvi is the orange-hued 6 Corvi, an ageing giant star of spectral type K1III that is around 70 times as luminous as the Sun. It is 331 ± 10 light-years away from Earth.

Named Alchiba, Alpha Corvi is a white-hued star of spectral type F1V and magnitude 4.0, 48.7 ± 0.1 light-years from Earth. It exhibits periodic changes in its spectrum over a three-day period, which suggests it is either a spectroscopic binary or (more likely) a pulsating Gamma Doradus-type variable. If the latter is the case, it is estimated to be 1.39 times as massive as the Sun. According to Bayer's atlas, it lies above the bird's beak.

Marking the raven's right wing is Eta Corvi, a yellow-white main-sequence star of type F2V that is 1.52 times as massive and 4.87 times as luminous as the Sun. It is 59 light-years distant from the Solar System. Two debris disks have been detected orbiting this star, one warm within 3.5 astronomical units and another out at ~150 astronomical units distant. Zeta Corvi marks the raven's neck. It is of apparent magnitude 5.21, separated by 7 arcseconds from the star HR 4691. Located 420 ± 10 light-years distant, it is a blue-white Be star of spectral type B8V, the presence of hydrogen emission lines in its spectrum indicating it has a circumstellar disc. These stars may be an optical double or a true multiple star system, with a separation of at least 50,000 astronomical units and the stars taking 3.5 million years to orbit each other. HR 4691 is itself double, composed of an ageing yellow-orange giant whose spectral type has been calculated at K0 or G3, and an F-type main-sequence star.

31 Crateris (which was originally placed in Crater by Flamsteed) is a 5.26 magnitude star which was once mistaken for a moon of Mercury. On 27 March 1974, the Mariner 10 mission detected emissions in the far ultraviolet from the planet (suggesting a satellite), but they were found to emanate from the star. It is in reality a remote binary star system with a hot blue-white star of spectral type B1.5V and a companion about which little is known. The two stars orbit each other every 2.9631 days. The primary is possibly a blue straggler of the Hyades group. The primary is around 15.5 times as massive as the Sun and 52262 times as luminous.

VV Corvi is a close spectroscopic binary, its two component stars orbiting each other with a period of 1.46 days. Both are yellow-white main-sequence stars of spectral type F5V, though the primary has begun expanding and cooling as it nears the end of its time on the main sequence. The mass ratio of the two stars is 0.775 ± 0.024. A tertiary companion was discovered during the Two Micron All-Sky Survey. W Corvi is an eclipsing binary that varies in brightness from apparent magnitude 11.16 to 12.5 over 9 hours. Its period has increased by 1/4 second over a century. It is an unusual system in that its two stars are very close to each other yet have different surface temperatures, and hence thermal transfer is not taking place as expected. SX Corvi is an eclipsing binary that is also a contact binary known as a W Ursae Majoris variable. The two component stars orbit closely enough to each other for mass to have been transferred between them—in this case the secondary having transferred a large amount of mass to the primary. RV Corvi is another eclipsing binary. Its brightness varies from apparent magnitude 8.6 to 9.16 over 18 hours. The system is composed of stars of spectral types F0 and G0, which orbit each other every 0.7473 days.

Close to Gamma Corvi and visible in the same binocular field is R Corvi, a long period (Mira) variable star. It ranges in brightness from a magnitude of 6.7 to 14.4 with a period of approximately 317 days. TT Corvi is a semiregular variable red giant of spectral type M3III and apparent magnitude 6.48 around 923 light years distant. It is around 993 times as luminous as the Sun. TU Corvi is a Delta Scuti variable—a class of short period (six hours at most) pulsating stars that have been used as standard candles and as subjects to study astroseismology. It varies by 0.025 of a magnitude around apparent magnitude 6.53 over 59 minutes.

Three star systems have confirmed planets. HD 103774 is a young yellow-white main-sequence star of apparent magnitude 7.12 that is 181 ± 5 light-years distant from Earth. It is 1.335 ± 0.03 times as massive and 3.5 ± 0.3 as luminous as the Sun. Variations in its radial velocity showed it was being orbited by a Neptune-sized planet every 5.9 days in 2013. HD 104067 is an orange dwarf of spectral type K2V of apparent magnitude 7.93 that is 69 ± 1 light-years distant from Earth. Around 80% as massive as the Sun, it is orbited by a planet 3.6 times the mass of Neptune every 55.8 days. WASP-83 has a planet around as massive as Saturn that orbits it every 5 days. It was discovered by its transit across the star in 2015. A fourth star system has an unconfirmed planet. HD 111031 is a sunlike star of spectral type G5V located 101 ± 2 light-years distant from Earth.

Ross 695 is a red dwarf star located a mere 28.9 ± 0.6 light-years distant from Earth. At apparent magnitude 11.27, it is much too faint to be seen with the unaided eye. A small star, it has around 23% the mass and radius of the Sun, but only 0.7% its luminosity. VHS J1256–1257 is a triple system of young brown dwarfs located 72.4+3.6
−3.9 light-years distant from Earth. The system consists of a central, equal-mass binary system of late-M spectral type dwarfs and an outer, planetary-mass brown dwarf companion that is widely separated at 102 ± 9 AU. DENIS-P J1228.2-1547 is a system composed of two brown dwarfs orbiting each other located 73 ± 3 light-years away from Earth. TV Corvi is a dwarf nova composed of a white dwarf and brown dwarf that orbit each other every 90 minutes. The system has a baseline magnitude of 17 that brightens periodically to magnitude 12, discovered by Clyde Tombaugh in 1931 and David Levy in 1990 and 2005.

=== Deep-sky objects ===
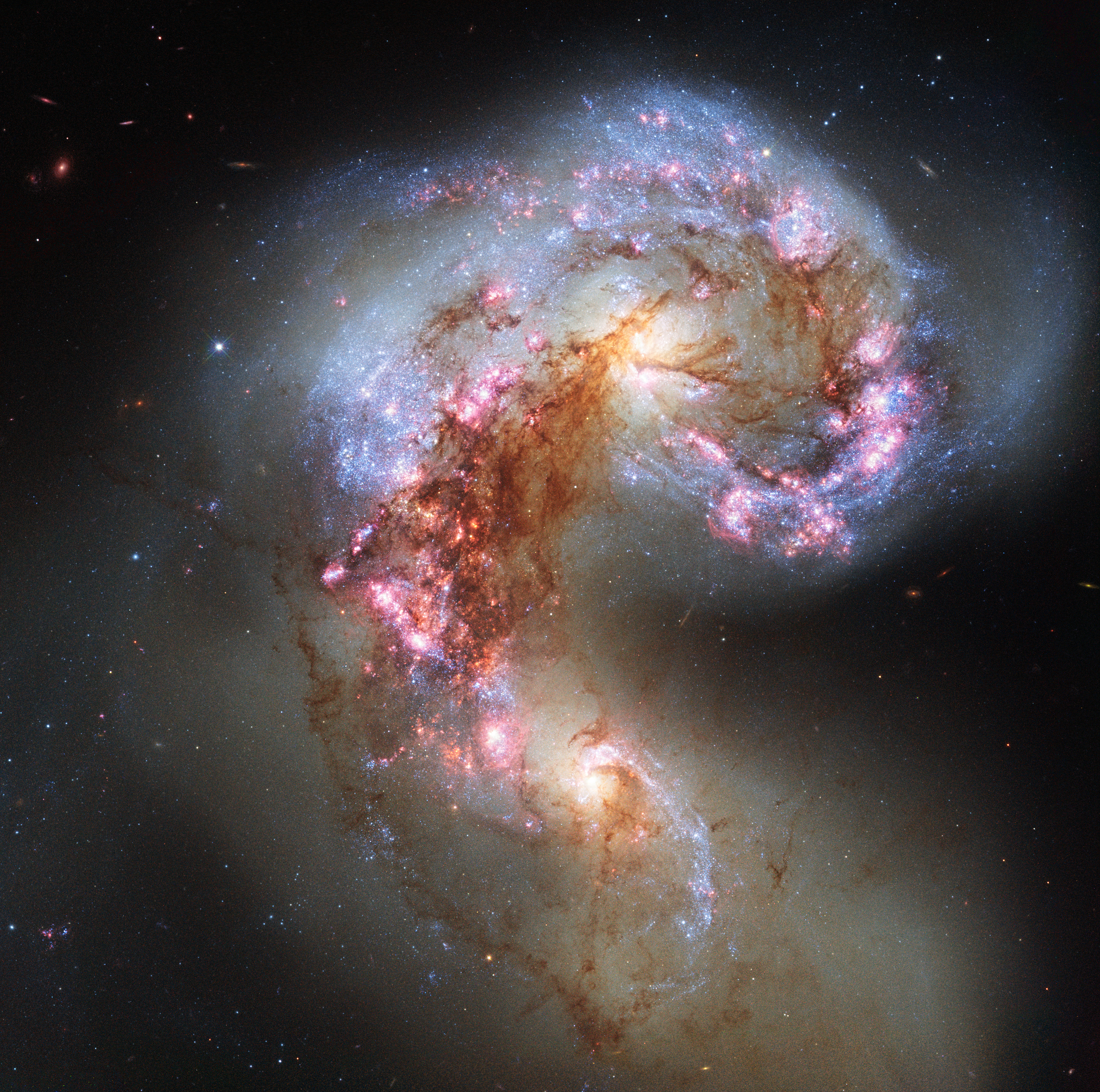
NGC 4038 (left) and NGC 4039 (right)

Corvus contains no Messier objects. It has several galaxies and a planetary nebula observable with amateur telescopes. The center of Corvus is home to a planetary nebula, NGC 4361. The nebula itself resembles a small elliptical galaxy and has a magnitude of 10.3, but the magnitude 13 star at its centre gives away its true nature. Corvus also contains the Stargate (asterism).

The NGC 4038 Group is a group of galaxies across Corvus and Crater. The group may contain between 13 and 27 galaxies. The best-known member is the Antennae peculiar galaxy, located 0.25 north of 31 Crateris. It consists of two interacting galaxies—NGC 4038 and 4039—that appear to have a heart shape as seen from Earth. The name originates from the huge tidal tails that come off the ends of the two galaxies, formed because of the spiral galaxies' original rotation. Both original galaxies were spiral galaxies and are now experiencing extensive star formation due to the interaction of gas clouds. The galaxies are 45 million light-years from Earth and each has multiple ultraluminous X-ray sources, the source of which is unknown. Astronomers theorize that they may be a rare type of x-ray emitting binary stars or intermediate-mass black holes. The Antennae Galaxies appear in a telescope at the 10th magnitude. SN 2004gt was a type Ic supernova that erupted on December 12, 2004. The progenitor was not identified from older images of the galaxy, and is either a type WC Wolf–Rayet star with a mass over 40 times that of the Sun, or a star 20 to 40 times as massive as the Sun in a binary star system. SN 2007sr was a Type Ia supernova event that peaked in brightness on December 14, 2007. The galaxy has been identified as a good place to take detailed images in case of further supernovae.

NGC 4027 is another member of the NGC 4038 group, notable for its extended spiral arm. Known as the Ringtail Galaxy, it lies close to 31 Crateris. A barred spiral galaxy, its distorted shape is probably due to a past collision, possibly with the nearby NGC 4027A. NGC 4782 and NGC 4783 are a pair of merging elliptical galaxies in the northeastern part of the constellation, around 200 million light-years distant.

=== Meteor showers ===
Two established meteor showers originate from within Corvus' boundaries. German astronomer Cuno Hoffmeister discovered and named the Corvids in 1937, after observing them between June 25 and July 2. They have not been seen since, nor was there evidence of a shower when previous records were examined. Hoffmeister noted the trajectory of the shower was similar to that of the comet 11P/Tempel–Swift–LINEAR, though this was not confirmed by Zhukov and colleagues in 2011. The shower has been tentatively linked with 4015 Wilson–Harrington. In January 2013, the MO Video Meteor Network published the discovery of the Eta Corvids, assigning some 300 meteors seen between January 20 and 26. Their existence was confirmed by data analysis later that year.

== In culture ==
In 1624, German astronomer Jakob Bartsch equated the constellation Argo Navis with Noah's Ark, linking Corvus and Columba to the crow and dove that feature in the story in Genesis.

In Action Comics #14 (January 2013), which was published 7 November 2012, astrophysicist Neil deGrasse Tyson appears in the story, in which he determines that Superman's home planet, Krypton, orbited the red dwarf LHS 2520 in the constellation Corvus, 27.1 light-years from Earth. Tyson assisted DC Comics in selecting a real-life star that would be an appropriate parent star to Krypton, and picked the star in Corvus, the mascot of Superman's high school, the Smallville Crows.

== See also ==
- Corvus (Chinese astronomy)

== Sources ==
- Ridpath, Ian; Tirion, Wil (2001). Stars and Planets Guide. Princeton University Press. ISBN 0-691-08913-2.
