= Epsilon Corvi =

Red giant star in the constellation Corvus

- Location of ε Corvi (circled)

Observation data Epoch J2000 Equinox ICRS
- Constellation: Corvus
- Right ascension: 12^{h} 10^{m} 07.48058^{s}
- Declination: −22° 37′ 11.1620″
- Apparent magnitude (V): +3.024

Characteristics
- Evolutionary stage: red giant
- Spectral type: K2 III
- U−B color index: +1.458
- B−V color index: +1.318

Astrometry
Radial velocity (R_{v})	+4.9 km/s
Proper motion (μ)	RA: −71.74 mas/yr Dec.: +10.25 mas/yr
Parallax (π)	10.26±0.16 mas
Distance	318 ± 5 ly (97 ± 2 pc)
Absolute magnitude (M_{V})	−1.82+0.15 −0.14

Details
Mass	2.97±0.43 M_{☉}
Radius	56.65±2.24 R_{☉}
Luminosity	930±54 L_{☉}
Surface gravity (log g)	1.42±0.10 cgs
Temperature	4,239±57 K
Metallicity [Fe/H]	−0.18±0.10 dex
Rotational velocity (v sin i)	1.0 km/s
Age	590±210 Myr

Other designations
- Minkar, ε Crv, 2 Crv, NSV 5483, BD−21°3487, FK5 453, GC 16618, HD 105707, HIP 59316, HR 4630, SAO 180531, PPM 259949

Database references
SIMBAD	data

Epsilon Corvi is a star in the southern constellation of Corvus. It has the proper name Minkar, pronounced /ˈmɪŋkɑːr/; Epsilon Corvi is its Bayer designation. This star is visible to the naked eye with an apparent visual magnitude of +3.02. Based on parallax measurements, it is located at a distance of 318 light-years (97 parsecs) from Sun.

This is a red giant star with a stellar classification of K2 III, having consumed the hydrogen at its core and evolved away from the main sequence. With about three times the Sun's mass, it has expanded to 57 times the Sun's radius. The photosphere irradiates 930 times more energy than the Sun and has an effective temperature of 4,239 K, giving it an orange hue that is characteristic of a K-type star. It spent much of its life as a main sequence star of spectral type B5V.

== Etymology ==
Epsilon Corvi is a Bayer designation that is Latinized from ε Corvi and abbreviated Epsilon Crv or ε Crv. This star has the traditional name Minkar, pronounced /ˈmɪŋkɑːr/, from the Arabic منقار minqar meaning "beak [of the crow]"

In Chinese, 軫宿 (Zhěn Sù), meaning Chariot (asterism), refers to an asterism consisting of ε Corvi, γ Corvi, δ Corvi and β Corvi. Consequently, ε Corvi itself is known as 軫宿二 (Zhěn Sù èr, English: the Second Star of Chariot.).
