= Zeta Corvi =

Star in the constellation Corvus

- Location of ζ Corvi (circled)

Observation data Epoch J2000.0 Equinox ICRS
- Constellation: Corvus
- Right ascension: 12^{h} 20^{m} 33.642^{s}
- Declination: −22° 12′ 57.242″
- Apparent magnitude (V): 5.21

Characteristics
- Evolutionary stage: main sequence
- Spectral type: B8V
- U−B color index: −0.39
- B−V color index: −0.090±0.004

Astrometry
Radial velocity (R_{v})	−6.40±4.2 km/s
Proper motion (μ)	RA: −108.879 mas/yr Dec.: −27.661 mas/yr
Parallax (π)	8.4789±0.0886 mas
Distance	385 ± 4 ly (118 ± 1 pc)
Absolute magnitude (M_{V})	−0.32

Details
Mass	3.39±0.04 M_{☉}
Radius	4.57±0.09 R_{☉}
Luminosity	200 L_{☉}
Surface gravity (log g)	2.26±0.02 cgs
Temperature	11,561 K
Rotational velocity (v sin i)	259 km/s
Age	232±30 Myr

Other designations
- ζ Crv, 5 Crv, BD−21°3514, HD 107348, HIP 60189, HR 4696, SAO 180700

Database references
SIMBAD	data

Zeta Corvi is a blue-white hued star or star system in the southern constellation of Corvus. Its name is a Bayer designation that is Latinized from ζ Corvi, and abbreviated Zeta Crv or ζ Crv. This star is visible to the naked eye with an apparent magnitude 5.21. Based on parallax measurements, it is located 385 light-years (118 pc) distant from the Sun, but it is drifting closer with a line of sight velocity component of −6 km/s.

This is a B-type main-sequence star with a stellar classification of B8V. It has 3.4 times the mass and 4.6 times the radius of the Sun. This star is radiating approximately 154 times that of the Sun with an effective temperature of 10,695 K. It is a Be star, with the presence of hydrogen emission lines in its spectrum indicating it has a circumstellar disk of decreated material. The star is spinning rapidly with a projected rotational velocity of 259 km/s.

Zeta Corvi is separated by 7 arcminutes from the 6th magnitude star HR 4691. The two may be an optical double or a true multiple star system, with a separation of at least 50,000 astronomical units and the stars taking 3.5 million years to orbit each other. HR 4691 is itself double, composed of an ageing yellow-orange giant whose spectral type has been calculated at K0 or G3, and an F-type main-sequence star.

In Chinese astronomy, this star is named Changsha (simplified Chinese: 长沙; traditional Chinese: 長沙). This was translated by R. H. Allen as "a Long Sand-bank", but according to Ian Ridpath it represents a coffin. Changsha is the capital of Hunan province in China.
