= Alpha Corvi =

Star in the constellation Corvus

- Location of α Corvi (circled in red)

Observation data Epoch J2000 Equinox ICRS
- Constellation: Corvus
- α Crv A
- Right ascension: 12^{h} 08^{m} 24.81727^{s}
- Declination: −24° 43′ 43.9521″
- Apparent magnitude (V): 4.03
- α Crv B
- Right ascension: 12^{h} 08^{m} 24.68483^{s}
- Declination: −24° 43′ 44.3974″

Characteristics

α Crv A
- Evolutionary stage: main sequence
- Spectral type: F1 V
- U−B color index: +0.00
- B−V color index: +0.34
- Variable type: Gamma Doradus?

α Crv B
- Evolutionary stage: main sequence
- Spectral type: M4 V

Astrometry

α Crv A
Radial velocity (R_{v})	+3.0 km/s
Proper motion (μ)	RA: +96.976 mas/yr Dec.: −40.023 mas/yr
Parallax (π)	66.7696±0.1804 mas
Distance	48.8 ± 0.1 ly (14.98 ± 0.04 pc)
Absolute magnitude (M_{V})	3.25

α Crv B
Proper motion (μ)	RA: +23.99 mas/yr Dec.: −59.66 mas/yr
Parallax (π)	66.2258±0.1704 mas
Distance	49.2 ± 0.1 ly (15.10 ± 0.04 pc)

Details

α Crv A
Mass	1.34+0.06 −0.04 M_{☉}
Radius	1.42±0.03 R_{☉}
Luminosity	4.31±0.23 L_{☉}
Surface gravity (log g)	4.192±0.030 cgs
Temperature	6,985+66 −64 K
Metallicity [Fe/H]	−0.04 dex
Rotational velocity (v sin i)	16.9±1.5 km/s
Age	1.2–1.58 Gyr

Other designations
- Alchiba, Al Minliar al Ghurab, Al Chiba, α Crv, 1 Crv, CD−24°10174, GJ 455.3, GJ 9389, HD 105452, HIP 59199, HR 4623, SAO 180505

Database references
SIMBAD	Alpha Corvi A
- Alpha Corvi B

Alpha Corvi is a binary star system in the southern constellation of Corvus. It has the proper name Alchiba, pronounced /ˈælkɪbə/; Alpha Corvi is its Bayer designation. Despite its "alpha" designation, it is the fifth-brightest star in Corvus with an apparent visual magnitude of 4.03. Based on parallax measurements made by the Gaia mission, it is approximately 49 light-years (15 pc) from the Sun.

== Nomenclature ==
α Corvi, which is Latinised to Alpha Corvi and abbreviated Alpha Crv or α Crv, is the star's Bayer designation.

It bore the traditional names Al Chiba (Arabic: ألخبا al-xibā, 'tent') and Al Minliar al Ghurab (Arabic منقار الغراب al-manxar al-ghurab) or Minkar al Ghurab. The latter appeared in the catalogue of stars in the Calendarium of Al Achsasi al Mouakket, which was translated into Latin as Rostrum Corvi, 'beak of the crow'. In 2016, the International Astronomical Union organized a Working Group on Star Names (WGSN) to catalogue and standardize proper names for stars. The WGSN approved the name Alchiba for the primary star on 12 September 2016 and it is now so included in the List of IAU-approved Star Names.

In Chinese astronomy, Alchiba is called 右轄, Pinyin: yòuxiá, meaning 'right linchpin', because it stands alone in the 'right linchpin' asterism, Chariot mansion (see: Chinese constellations), 右轄, yòuxiá was westernized into Yew Hea by R.H. Allen.

=== Namesake ===
USS Alchiba (AKA-6) is a former United States Navy ship.

== Properties ==
The two components of Alpha Corvi are separated by roughly 3.1 arcsec. They were found to be a physical pair in 2021. The proper motion differences between both components are much larger than expected for the orbital motion, assuming a total mass of two solar masses and a circular orbit in the plane of the sky. This could indicate that the system is dissolving, or simply that the assumptions are incorrect.

Alpha Corvi A, or Alchiba, has a spectral class F1V, suggesting that it is a main sequence star fusing hydrogen into helium at its core. This star exhibits periodic changes in its spectrum over a three-day period, which suggests it is either a spectroscopic binary or (more likely) a pulsating Gamma Doradus-type variable. Alchiba has 34% more mass and is 42% larger than the Sun. It is 4.3 times more luminous and has a surface effective temperature of 6,985 K, giving it the yellow-white hue of an F-type star. The abundance of chemical elements other than hydrogen and helium, what astronomers name metallicity, is slightly lower than that of the Sun.

The secondary star, named Alpha Corvi B (or Alchiba B), is a red dwarf with a spectral type of M4V.

== See also ==
- List of nearest bright stars
- List of nearest F-type stars
- Eta Corvi
