= NGC 3955 =

Galaxy in the constellation Crater

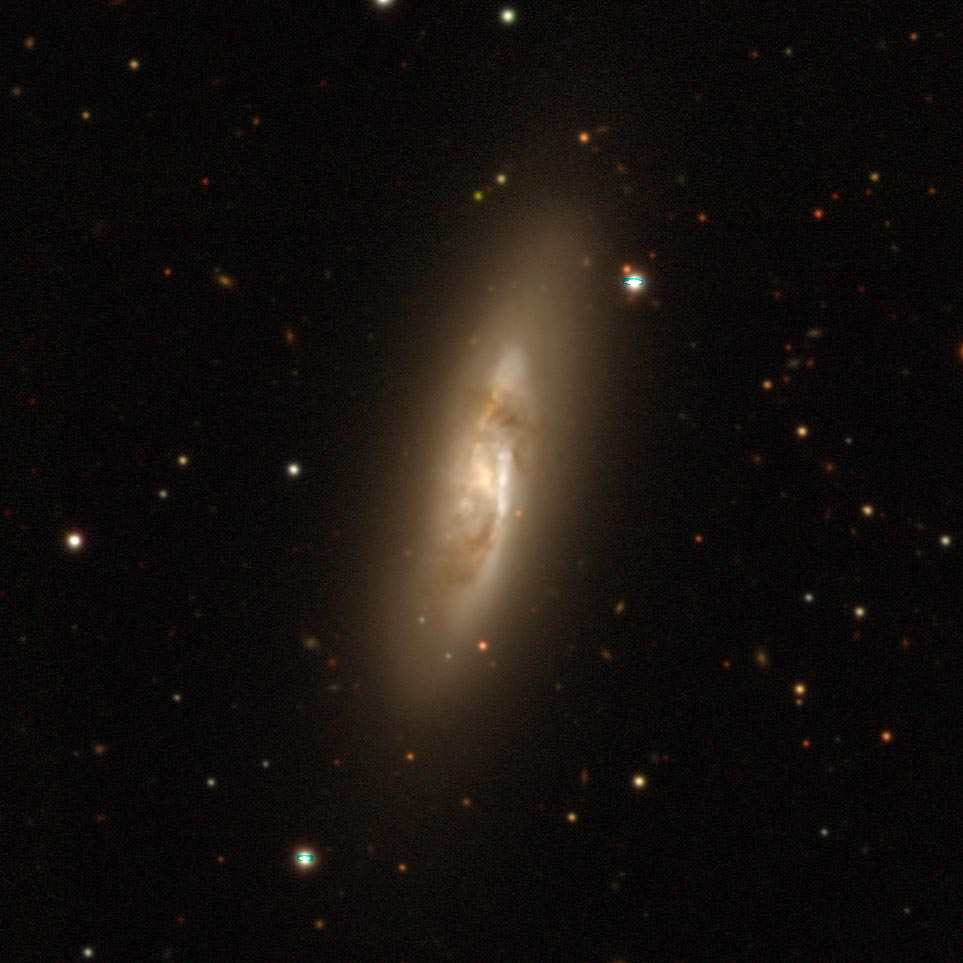
- NGC 3955 imaged by Legacy Surveys

Observation data (J2000 epoch)
- Constellation: Crater
- Right ascension: 11^{h} 53^{m} 57.1556^{s}
- Declination: −23° 09′ 50.891″
- Redshift: 0.004973±0.0000300
- Heliocentric radial velocity: 1,491±9 km/s
- Distance: 67.19 Mly (20.600 Mpc)
- Group or cluster: NGC 4038 Group (LGG 263)
- Apparent magnitude (V): 12.89

Characteristics
- Type: S0/a pec
- Size: ~105,400 ly (32.32 kpc) (estimated)
- Apparent size (V): 2.9′ × 0.9′

Other designations
- ESO 504- G 026, IRAS 11514-2253, 2MASX J11535713-2309513, MCG -04-28-005, PGC 37320

NGC 3955 is a peculiar lenticular galaxy in the constellation of Crater. Its velocity with respect to the cosmic microwave background is 1,842±26 km/s, which corresponds to a Hubble distance of 88.6 ± 6.3 Mly (27.16 ± 1.94 Mpc). Additionally, one non-redshift measurement gives a closer distance of 67.19 Mly (20.600 Mpc). It was discovered by German-British astronomer William Herschel on 21 December 1786.

NGC 3955 has a possible active galactic nucleus, i.e. it has a compact region at the center of a galaxy that emits a significant amount of energy across the electromagnetic spectrum, with characteristics indicating that this luminosity is not produced by the stars.

== NGC 4038 group ==
NGC 3955 is a member of the NGC 4038 group (also known as LGG 263). This group contains 27 galaxies, including NGC 3956, NGC 3957, NGC 3981, NGC 4024, NGC 4027, NGC 4033, NGC 4035, the Antennae Galaxies, and NGC 4050, among others.

== Supernova ==
One supernova has been observed in NGC 3955:

- SN 2026gzx (Type Ic, mag. 16.797) was discovered by ATLAS on 23 March 2026. It was initially classified as Type Ia, but later analysis concluded it was Type Ic.

== See also ==
- List of NGC objects (3001–4000)
