= Crater Cloud =

Series of galaxy clusters and a major component of the Virgo Supercluster

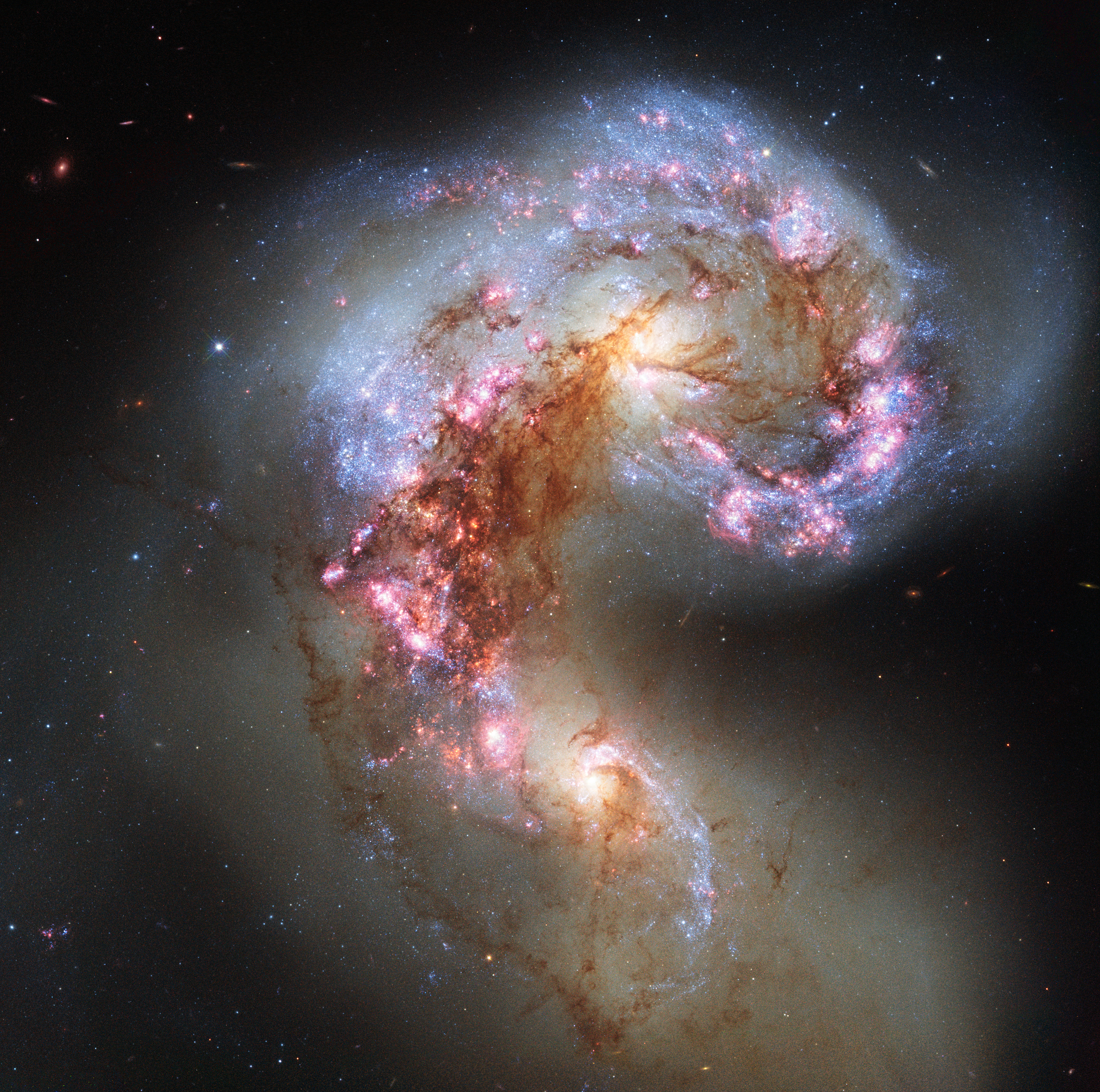
- The Antennae Galaxies, which are the brightest members of the NGC 4038 Group, the largest group in the Crater Cloud.

Observation data (Epoch )
- Parent structure: Virgo Supercluster
- Major axis: 7.9 Mpc (26 Mly)
- Distance: 23.31 Mpc (76 Mly)

The Crater Cloud is a galaxy filament consisting of at least 11 galaxy groups. It is located approximately 23.31 Mpc (76 Mly) from the Solar System. The Crater Cloud lies about 7 Mpc (23 Mly) below the Virgo Southern Extension.

The Crater Cloud, along with the Leo Cloud, is actually part of the same branch of a larger galaxy filament that extends from the Centaurus Cluster through the Virgo Cluster and continues through the Ursa Major Cluster, known as the Virgo Strand. The Virgo Strand is the main component of the Virgo Supercluster and is made of two branches with the lower branch consisting of the Leo and Crater clouds, while the upper branch is known as the Virgo Southern Extension or Virgo II Groups.

The Crater Cloud is prolate and points toward the Virgo Cluster.

== List of groups ==
Below is a list of groups in the Crater Cloud according to astronomer Brent Tully.

Column 1: The name of the group in Tully's NBGG
Column 2: The right ascension for epoch 2000.
Column 3: The declination for epoch 2000.
Column 4: Number of members of the group.
Column 5: Brightest member of the group
Column 6: Redshift of the group.
Column 7: Distance of the group (Millions of light-years).
Column 8: Cross-Identifications with other catalogs.

(Sources for data columns:)

Groups within the Crater Cloud
Name of group	R.A. (J2000)	Dec. (J2000)	Number of members	Brightest member	Redshift	Distance (Mly)	Cross-ID
NBGC 22-1	11h 59m 57.2s	-19d 16m 21s	13 (Tully); 14 (Fourque); 20 (Garcia); 17/14/13 (Giuricin)	NGC 4038	0.005621	91	NGC 4038 Group, LGG 263, NOGG H 580, NOGG P1 596, NOGG P2 603
NBGC 22-2	11h 43m 30.1s	-10d 28m 35s	3 (Tully); 4 (Fourque); 5 (Garcia); 3/6/6 (Giuricin)	NGC 3892	0.005831	94	NGC 3892 Group, LGG 248, NGC 3732 Group, NOGG H 544, NOGG P1 570, NOGG P2 579
NBGC 22-3	12h 16m 29.0s	-11d 31m 42s	2 (Tully)	DDO 116	0.003901	68	
NBGC 22-4	11h 48m 30s	-28d 31m 42s	9 (Tully); 7 (Fourque); 9 (Garcia); 5/11/11 (Giuricin)	NGC 3923	0.005801	71	NGC 3923 Group, LGG 255, NGC 3936 Group, LGG 253 NOGG H 568, NOGG P1 581, NOGG P2 590
NBGC 22-5	12h 06m 34.7s	-29d 24m 16s	3 (Tully); 6 (Fourque); 5 (Garcia); 4 (Giuricin)	NGC 4105	0.006198	97	NGC 4105 Group, LGG 270, NOGG H 590, NOGG P1 607, NOGG P2 614
NBGC 22-6	11h 13m 01.3s	-26d 53m 15s	2 (Tully); 3 (Fourque); 6 (Garcia); 5 (Giuricin)	NGC 3585	0.004783	79	NGC 3585 Group, LGG 230, NOGG H 511, NOGG P1 526, NOGG P2 536
NBGC 22-7	11h 23m 08.6s	-09d 59m 42s	3 (Tully); 3 (Fourque); 3 (Garcia); 3 (Giuricin)	NGC 3672	0.005987	96	NGC 3672 Group, LGG 235, NOGG H 521, NOGG P1 535, NOGG P2 545
NBGC 22-8	11h 41m 40s	-06d 19m 00s	2 (Tully); 2 (Giuricin)	NGC 3818	0.005674	92	NGC 3818 Group, NOGG H 552, NOGG P1 569, NOGG P2 578
NBGC 22-9	11h 52m 26.5s	-04d 18m 37s	2 (Tully); 4 (Garcia); 3 (Giuricin)	NGC 3952	0.005260	86	NGC 3952 Group, LGG 257, NOGG H 572, NOGG P1 590, NOGG P2 599
NBGC 22-10	12h 00m 14.6s	-01d 14m 03s	2 (Tully); 4 (Garcia); 3 (Giuricin)	NGC 4030	0.004760	80	NGC 4030 Group, LGG 264, NOGG H 583, NOGG P1 601, NOGG P2 609
NBGC 22-11	12h 10m 28.7s	02d 01m 05s	2 (Tully); 3 (Fourque); 6 (Garcia); 4/5/4 (Giuricin)	NGC 4179	0.004336	74	NGC 4179 Group, NGC 4123 Group, LGG 275, NOGG H 596, NOGG P1 613, NOGG P2 621

== See also ==
- Virgo II Groups
- Virgo III Groups
