= NGC 3923 =

Elliptical galaxy in the constellation Hydra

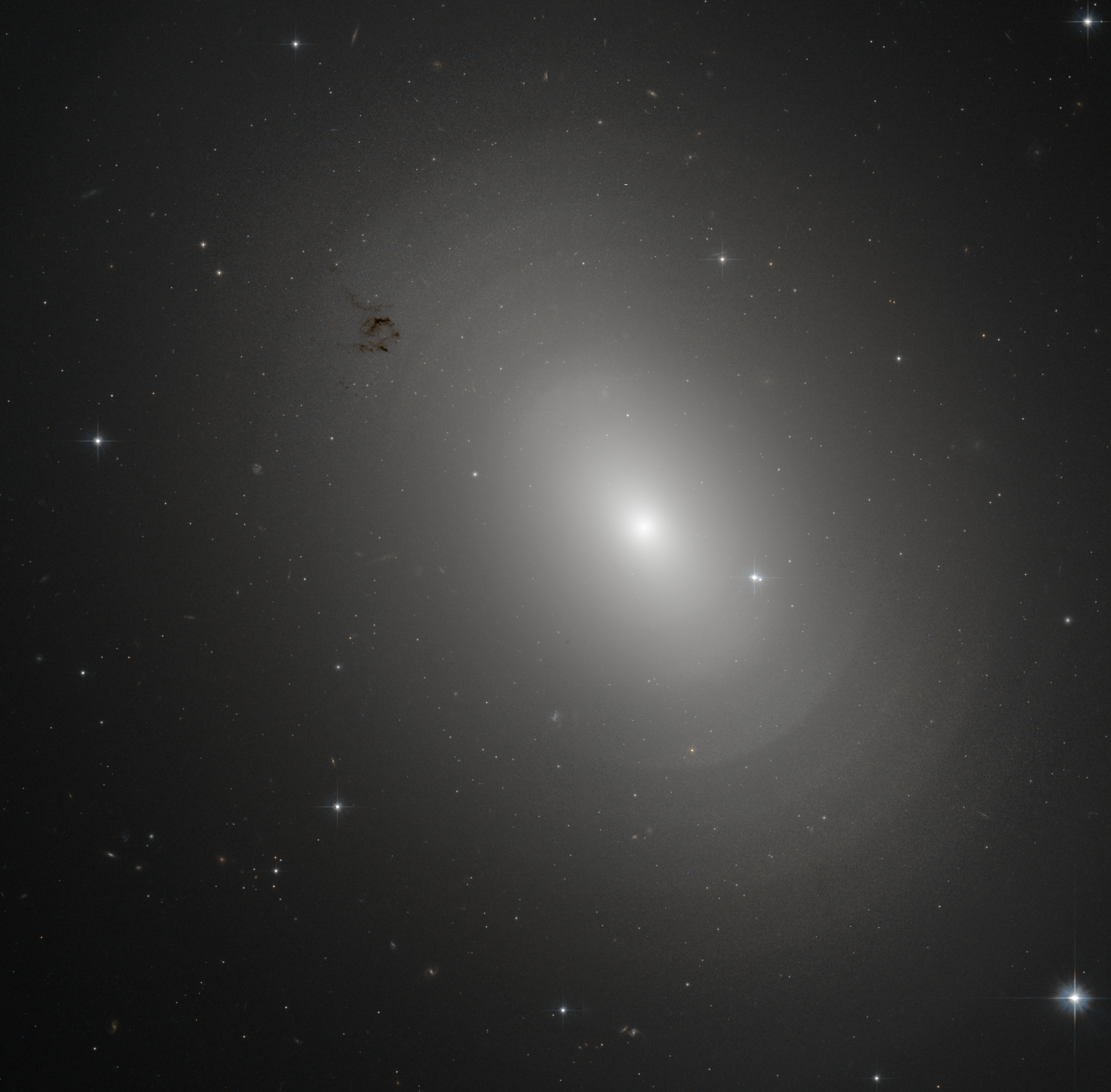
- NGC 3923 by imaged by the Hubble Space Telescope

Observation data (J2000 epoch)
- Constellation: Hydra
- Right ascension: 11^{h} 51^{m} 01.7118^{s}
- Declination: −28° 48′ 21.386″
- Redshift: 0.005801±0.00003
- Heliocentric radial velocity: 1739±9 km/s
- Distance: 71 ± 23 Mly (21.6 ± 7.0 Mpc)
- Apparent magnitude (V): 9.6

Characteristics
- Type: E4–5
- Size: ~264,700 ly (81.16 kpc) (estimated)
- Apparent size (V): 5.9′ × 3.9′
- Notable features: Shell galaxy

Other designations
- ESO 440- G 017, AM 1148-283, MCG -05-28-012, PGC 37061

NGC 3923 is an elliptical galaxy located in the constellation Hydra. It is located at a distance of about 90 million light years from Earth, which, given its apparent dimensions, means that NGC 3923 is about 155,000 light years across. NGC 3923 is an example of a shell galaxy where the stars in its halo are arranged in layers. It has more than twenty shells. It was discovered by William Herschel on March 7, 1791.

== Characteristics ==
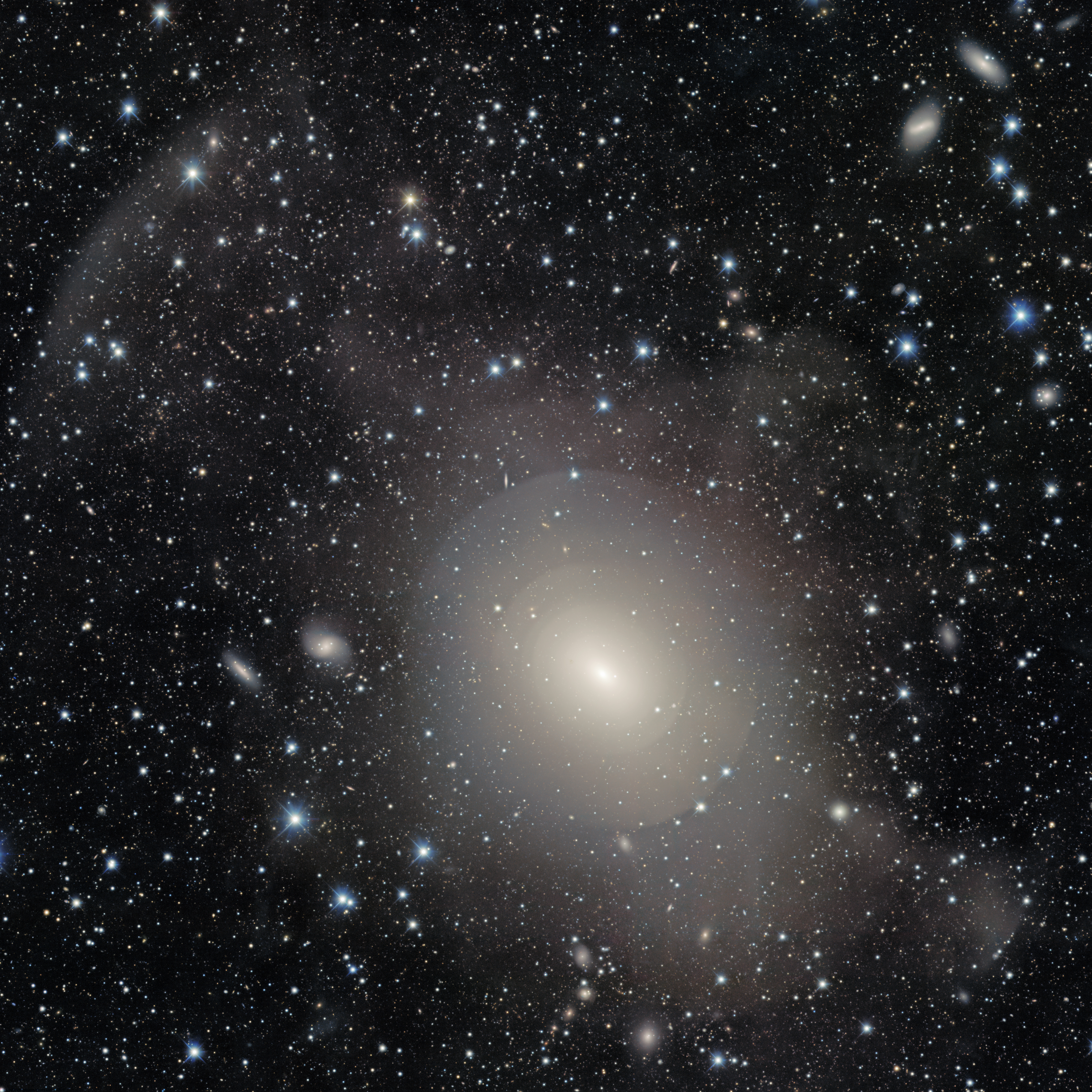
NGC 3923 imaged by the Cerro Tololo Inter-American Observatory

NGC 3923 is an example of a shell galaxy where the stars in its halo are arranged in layers. NGC 3923 has up to 42 shells, the highest number among all shell galaxies, and its shells are much more subtle than those of other shell galaxies. The shells of this galaxy are also symmetrical, while other shell galaxies are more skewed and asymmetrical. Concentric shells of stars enclosing a galaxy are quite common and are observed in many elliptical galaxies. In fact, every tenth elliptical galaxy exhibits this onion-like structure, which has never been observed in spiral galaxies. The shell-like structures are thought to develop as a consequence of galactic cannibalism, when a larger galaxy ingests a smaller companion. As the two centers approach, they initially oscillate about a common center, and this oscillation ripples outwards forming the shells of stars just as ripples on a pond spread when the surface is disturbed.

Deep imaging also detected a stream extending from the core of NGC 3923 and a small elliptical galaxy on its axis, which is a probable progenitor of some of the shells. Another stream lies south of the core of NGC 3923, and a hook like structure lies at the northwest.

Based on the velocity dispersion of the globular clusters of NGC 3923 the mass of the supermassive black hole of the galaxy was estimated to be (5.3±2.5)×10^{8} M_{☉}.

== Supernova ==
One supernova has been observed in NGC 3923. SN 2018aoz (Type Ia, mag. 15.1) was discovered by the Distance Less Than 40 Mpc Survey (DLT40) on 2 April 2018. It reached magnitude 12.7, making it tied with SN 2018pv for the brightest supernova of 2018.

== Nearby galaxies ==
NGC 3923 is the brightest galaxy in a galaxy group known as the NGC 3923 galaxy group. Seven dwarf elliptical galaxies within 25 arcminutes of NGC 3923 have been detected. NGC 3904 is located 37 arcminutes away. Other galaxies in the group include NGC 3885, ESO 440-27, and ESO 440-11. Other nearby galaxies include NGC 3617, NGC 3673, NGC 3717, NGC 3936, and NGC 4105.

== See also ==
- List of NGC objects (3001–4000)
