= NGC 3673 =

Galaxy in the constellation Hydra

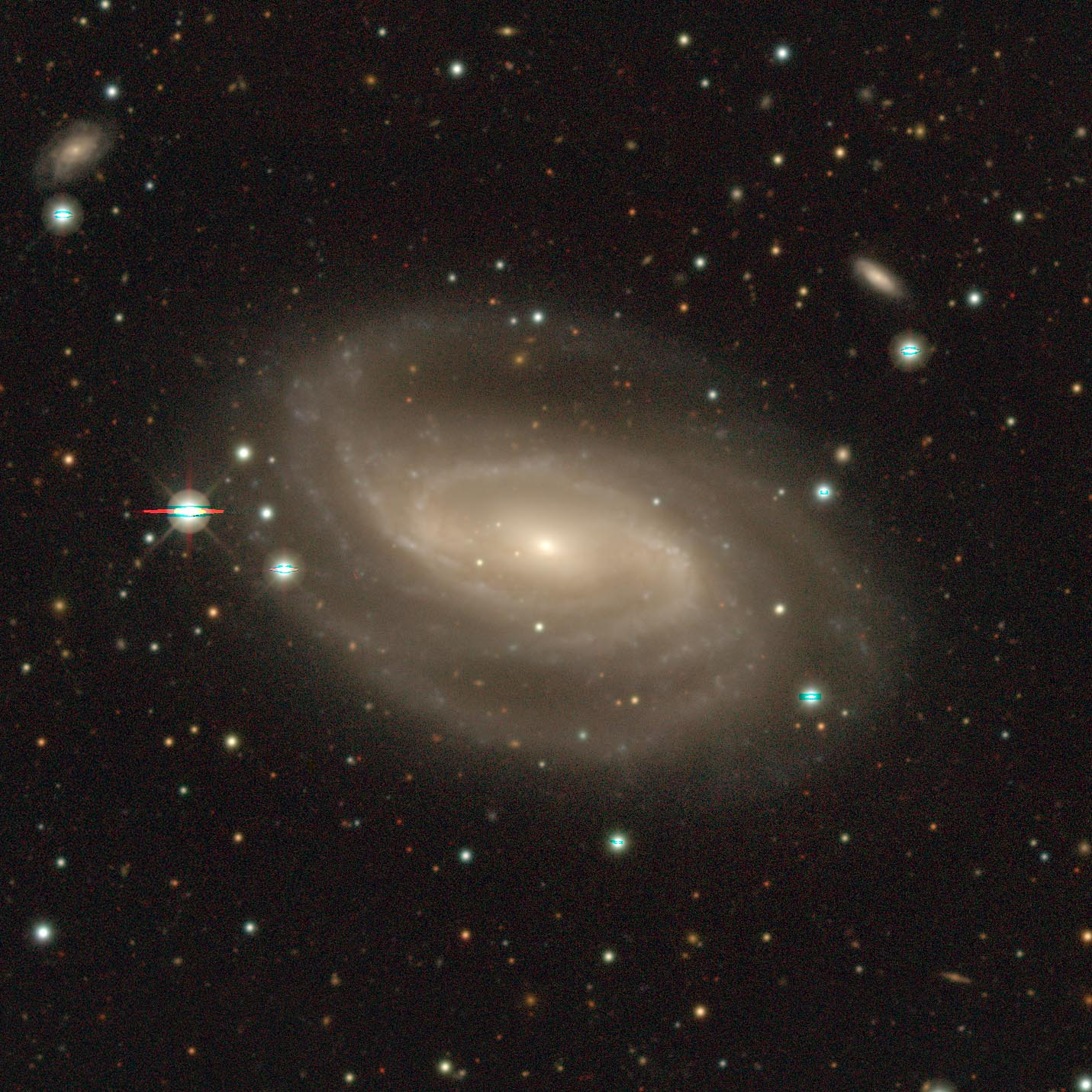
- NGC 3673 imaged by Legacy Surveys

Observation data (J2000 epoch)
- Constellation: Hydra
- Right ascension: 11^{h} 25^{m} 12.8697^{s}
- Declination: −26° 44′ 12.110″
- Redshift: 0.006471 ± 0.000010
- Heliocentric radial velocity: 1,940 ± 1 km/s
- Distance: 73.6 ± 11.1 Mly (22.6 ± 3.4 Mpc)
- Apparent magnitude (V): 11.5

Characteristics
- Type: SB(r)b
- Size: ~75,000 ly (23.1 kpc) (estimated)
- Apparent size (V): 3.6′ × 2.4′

Other designations
- ESO 503- G 016, AM 1122-262, IRAS 11227-2627, UGCA 236, MCG -04-27-010, PGC 35097

NGC 3673 is a barred spiral galaxy in the constellation Hydra. The galaxy lies about 75 million light years away from Earth, which means, given its apparent dimensions, that NGC 3673 is approximately 75,000 light years across. It was discovered by John Herschel on March 22, 1836.

The galaxy has a small, bright nucleus embedded in a bar, with distinctly blue color. The bar is weak and some darker areas are visible in it. The bar has X-shaped features. The bulge is weakly boxy. At the end of the bar a nearly complete ring is formed, measuring 1.5 by 0.7 arcminutes. From the ring emerge faint filamentary arms. The spiral pattern resembles more that of a grand design galaxy than a flocculent pattern. The star formation rate of the galaxy is estimated to be about 0.7 M_{☉} per year. In the centre of the galaxy lies a supermassive black hole, whose mass is estimated to be 10^{7.01 ± 0.37} (4.4 - 24 millions) M_{☉}, based on the pitch angle of the spiral arms.

NGC 3673 is a relatively isolated galaxy. It belongs to the same galaxy cloud as NGC 3923, NGC 3717, NGC 3885, NGC 3904, and NGC 4105 and their groups.
