= NGC 4038 Group =

Galaxy group in the constellations Corvus and Crater

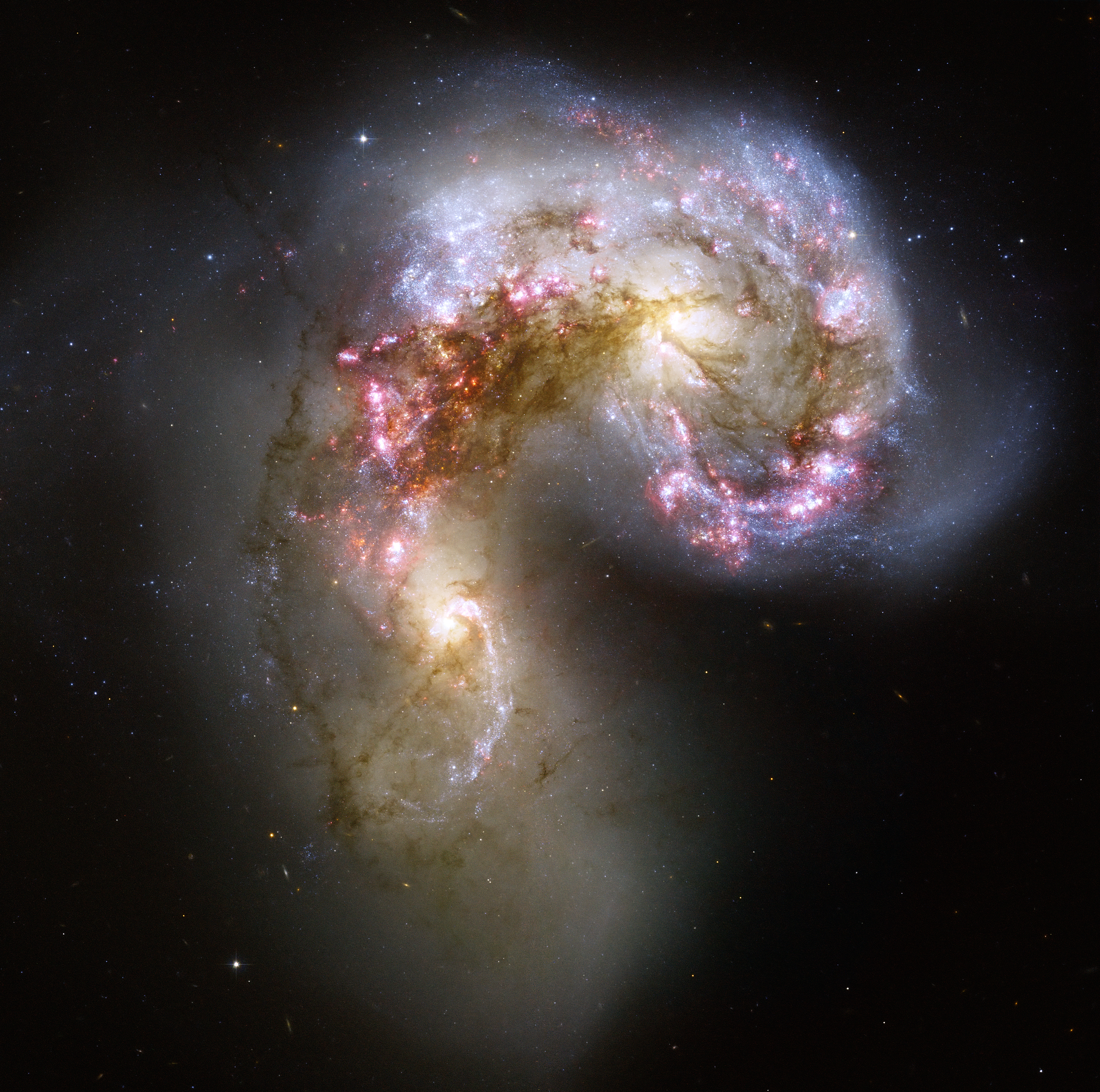
- Antennae Galaxies is the brightest members of the NGC 4038 Group

Observation data (Epoch J2000)
- Constellation(s): Corvus and Crater
- Right ascension
- Declination
- Brightest member: Antennae Galaxies
- Number of galaxies: 13-27

Other designations
- LGG 263, NOGG H 580, NOGG P1 596, NOGG P2 603

The NGC 4038 Group is a group of galaxies in the constellations Corvus and Crater. The group may contain between 13 and 27 galaxies. The group's best known galaxies are the Antennae Galaxies (NGC 4038/NGC4039), a well-known interacting pair of galaxies.

== Members ==
The table below lists galaxies that have been consistently identified as group members in the Nearby Galaxies Catalog, the survey of Fouque et al., the Lyons Groups of Galaxies (LGG) Catalog, and the three group lists created from the Nearby Optical Galaxy sample of Giuricin et al.

Members of the NGC 4038 Group
Name	Type	R.A. (J2000)	Dec. (J2000)	Redshift (km/s)	Apparent Magnitude
Antennae Galaxies (NGC 4038/NGC 4039)		12^{h} 01^{m} 53.3^{s}	−18° 52′ 30″	1705 ± 5	13.0
NGC 3956	SA(s)c	11^{h} 54^{m} 00.7^{s}	−20° 34′ 02″	1645 ± 5	13.1
NGC 3957	SA0	11^{h} 54^{m} 01.5^{s}	−19° 34′ 08″	1637 ± 19	13.1
NGC 3981	SAB(s)bc pec	11^{h} 56^{m} 07.5^{s}	−19° 53′ 46″	1723 ± 4	12.1
NGC 4024	SB0	11^{h} 58^{m} 31.2^{s}	−18° 20′ 49″	1694 ± 15	13.2
NGC 4027	SB(s)dm	11^{h} 59^{m} 30.2^{s}	−19° 15′ 55″	1671 ± 6	11.7
NGC 4033	E6	12^{h} 00^{m} 34.7^{s}	−17° 50′ 33″	1617 ± 20	13.2
NGC 4050	SB(r)ab	12^{h} 02^{m} 54.0^{s}	−16° 22′ 25″	1761 ± 8	13.1
PGC 37476	SB(rs)c	11^{h} 55^{m} 50.6^{s}	−18° 11′ 47″	1596 ± 8	14.0
PGC 38087	SB(s)cd	12^{h} 03^{m} 24.4^{s}	−19° 31′ 21″	1664 ± 7	15.0
UGCA 254	SAB(s)cd	11^{h} 54^{m} 49.5^{s}	−16° 51′ 50″	1813 ± 6	14.5
UGCA 257	SB(s)m	11^{h} 58^{m} 25.4^{s}	−22° 26′ 24″	1795 ± 5	13.6

Additionally, the references above frequently but inconsistently identify PGC 37513, PGC 37565, and UGCA 270 as members of this group. Based on the above references, the exact membership of this group is somewhat uncertain as is the exact number of galaxies within the group.

== Location ==
The NGC 4038 group along with other galaxies and galaxy groups are part of the Crater Cloud which is a component of the Virgo Supercluster.

== See also ==
- M96 Group - a similar group of galaxies
