= SN 2007sr =

Type Ia supernova event in the galaxy NGC 4038

- Event type: Supernova
- Ia
- Date: December 18, 2007
- Constellation: Corvus
- Right ascension: 12^{h} 01^{m} 52.80^{s}
- Declination: −18° 58′ 21.7″
- Epoch: J2000.0
- Galactic coordinates: 286.9944 +42.3602
- Distance: 72.7 ± 9.1 Mly (22.3 ± 2.8 Mpc)
- Redshift: 0.006, 0.0045
- Host: NGC 4038
- Peak apparent magnitude: 12.70
- Other designations: SN 2007sr

SN 2007sr was a Type Ia supernova event that happened in the galaxy NGC 4038. It was announced on December 18, 2007, but was visible on images beginning December 7. It peaked at magnitude 12.7 on December 14.
