= SN 2004gt =

Type Ic supernova in the interacting galaxy NGC 4038

SN 2004GT
- Event type: Supernova
- Ic
- Constellation: Corvus
- Right ascension: 12^{h} 01^{m} 50.37^{s}
- Declination: −18° 52′ 12.7″
- Epoch: J2000.0
- Galactic coordinates: 286.9460 +42.4568 (34" W, 10" S)
- Distance: 63 Mly (19.2 Mpc)
- Host: NGC 4038
- Peak apparent magnitude: 14.9
- Other designations: SN 2004gt

SN 2004GT was a Type Ic supernova that happened in the interacting galaxy NGC 4038 on December 12, 2004. The event occurred in a region of condensed matter in the western spiral arm. The progenitor was not identified from older images of the galaxy, and is either a type WC Wolf-Rayet star with a mass over 40 times that of the Sun, or a star 20 to 40 times as massive as the Sun in a binary star system.
