= NGC 3941 =

Galaxy in the constellation Ursa Major

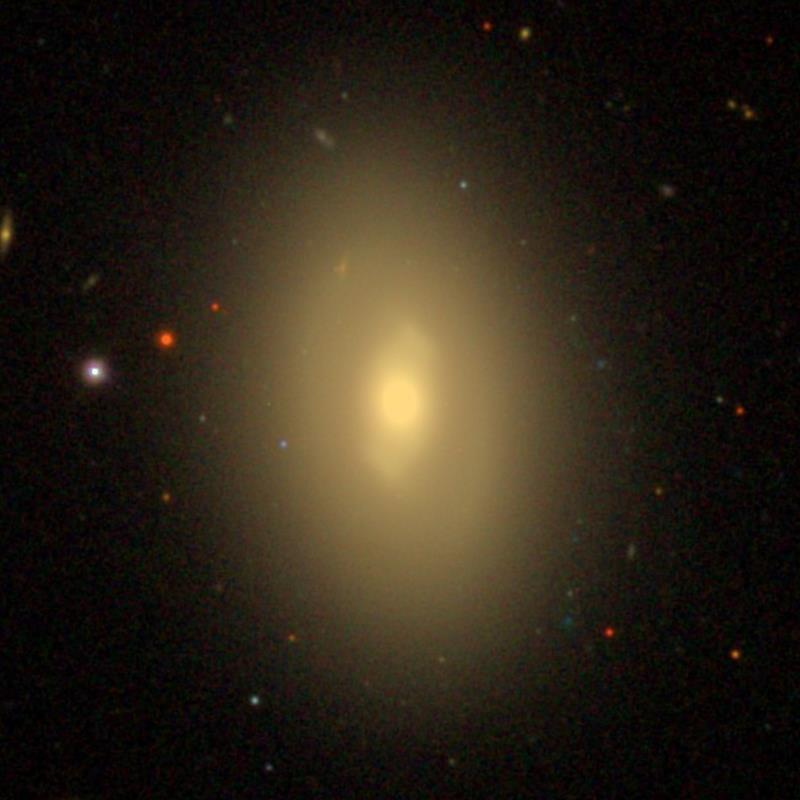
- SDSS image of NGC 3941

Observation data (J2000 epoch)
- Constellation: Ursa Major
- Right ascension: 11^{h} 52^{m} 55.4^{s}
- Declination: +36° 59′ 11″
- Redshift: 930±5 km/s
- Distance: 39 ± 11 Mly (12.0 ± 3.4 Mpc)
- Apparent magnitude (V): 10.3

Characteristics
- Type: SB(s)0^0^
- Apparent size (V): 3.5′ × 2.5′
- Notable features: Seyfert galaxy

Other designations
- NGC 3941, UGC 6857, MCG +06-26-051, PGC 37235

NGC 3941 is a barred lenticular galaxy located in the constellation Ursa Major. It is located at a distance of circa 40 million light years from Earth, which, given its apparent dimensions, means that NGC 3941 is about 40,000 light years across. It was discovered by German-British astronomer William Herschel on 19 March 1787.

== Characteristics ==
The galaxy has a counterrotating extended gas disk, which was possibly formed by a galaxy merger of accretion of gas with oppositely directed angular momentum. The disk has low velocity dispersion throughout, which suggests it has settled into equilibrium. The gas is found primarily in two rings. The inner appears almost circular in HI imaging, which may mean it is inclined ~20° or more with respect to the stellar disk, whereas the outer ring has approximately the same ellipticity with the stellar disk. The stellar disk is symmetric and there are evidence of weak spiral arms outside the primary bar. In the infrared Ks-band, the bar has ansae-type morphology and in the inner elliptical there is an inner disc showing two-armed spirals. Based on the fact that the spiral arms and the gas are rotating in different directions it has been suggested that the inner ionised gas and the outer HI gas are inclined, almost perpendicular to the stellar disk. The galaxy features also a secondary bar.

NGC 3941 is type 2 Seyfert galaxy. In the centre of the galaxy lies a supermassive black hole whose mass is estimated to be, based on velocity dispersion, 141 million (10^{8.14}) M_{☉}.

== Supernova ==
One supernova has been observed in NGC 3941:

- SN 2018pv (Type Ia, mag 15.1) was discovered by Masaki Tsuboi on 3 February 2018. Reaching magnitude 12.7, it was tied with SN 2018aoz for being the brightest supernova of 2018.

== Nearby galaxies ==
NGC 3941 forms a small galaxy group with NGC 3930 and UGC 6955, which is part of the Ursa Major Cluster.
