= NGC 4027 =

Galaxy in the constellation Corvus

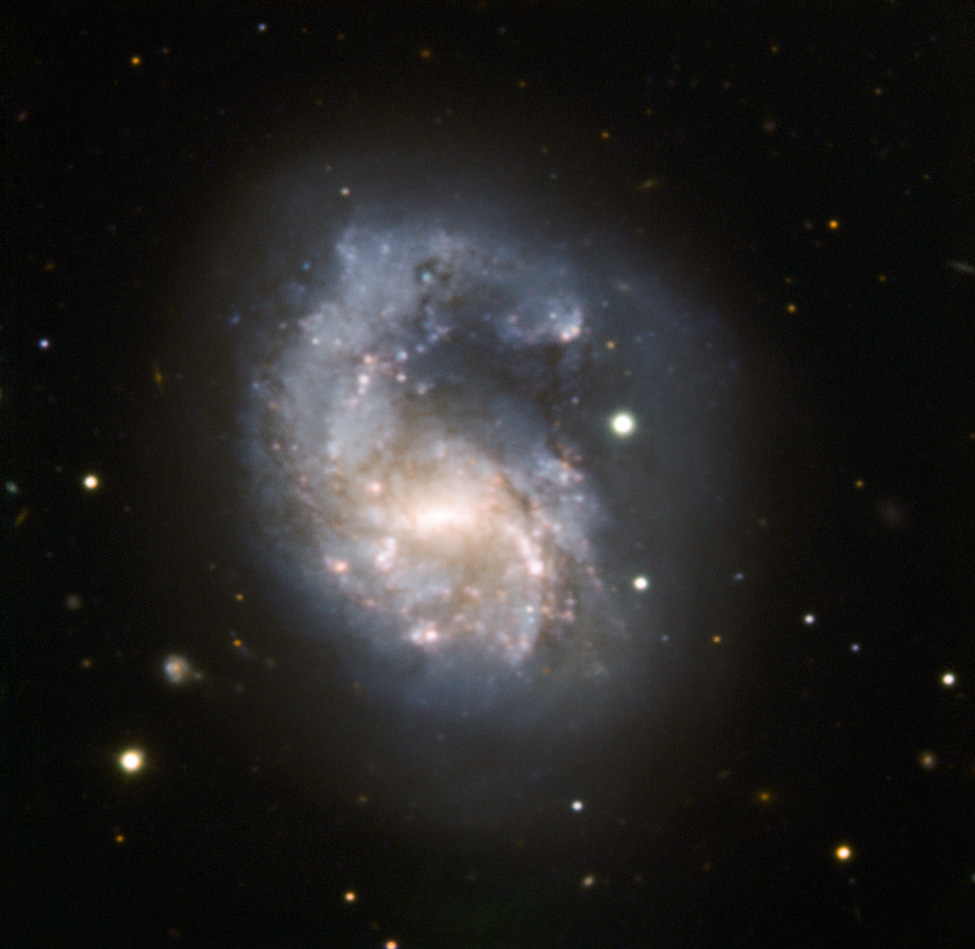
- ESO image of NGC 4027 (mirrored).

Observation data (J2000 epoch)
- Constellation: Corvus
- Right ascension: 11^{h} 59^{m} 30.2^{s}
- Declination: −19° 15′ 55″
- Redshift: 1671 ± 6 km/s
- Distance: 83 Mly (25 Mpc)
- Apparent magnitude (V): 11.0

Characteristics
- Type: SB(s)dm
- Apparent size (V): 3.2 × 2.4

Other designations
- NGC 4027, Arp 22, UGCA 260, PGC 37773, VV 066, VIII Zw 158

NGC 4027 is a barred spiral galaxy approximately 83 million light-years away in the constellation Corvus. Alternatively, it is known as Arp 22; it is a peculiar galaxy because one of its spiral arms goes out more than the other. This is probably due to a galactic collision in NGC 4027's past.

One supernova has been observed in NGC 4027: SN 1996W (Type II, mag. 16) was discovered by the BAO Supernova Survey on 10 April 1996.

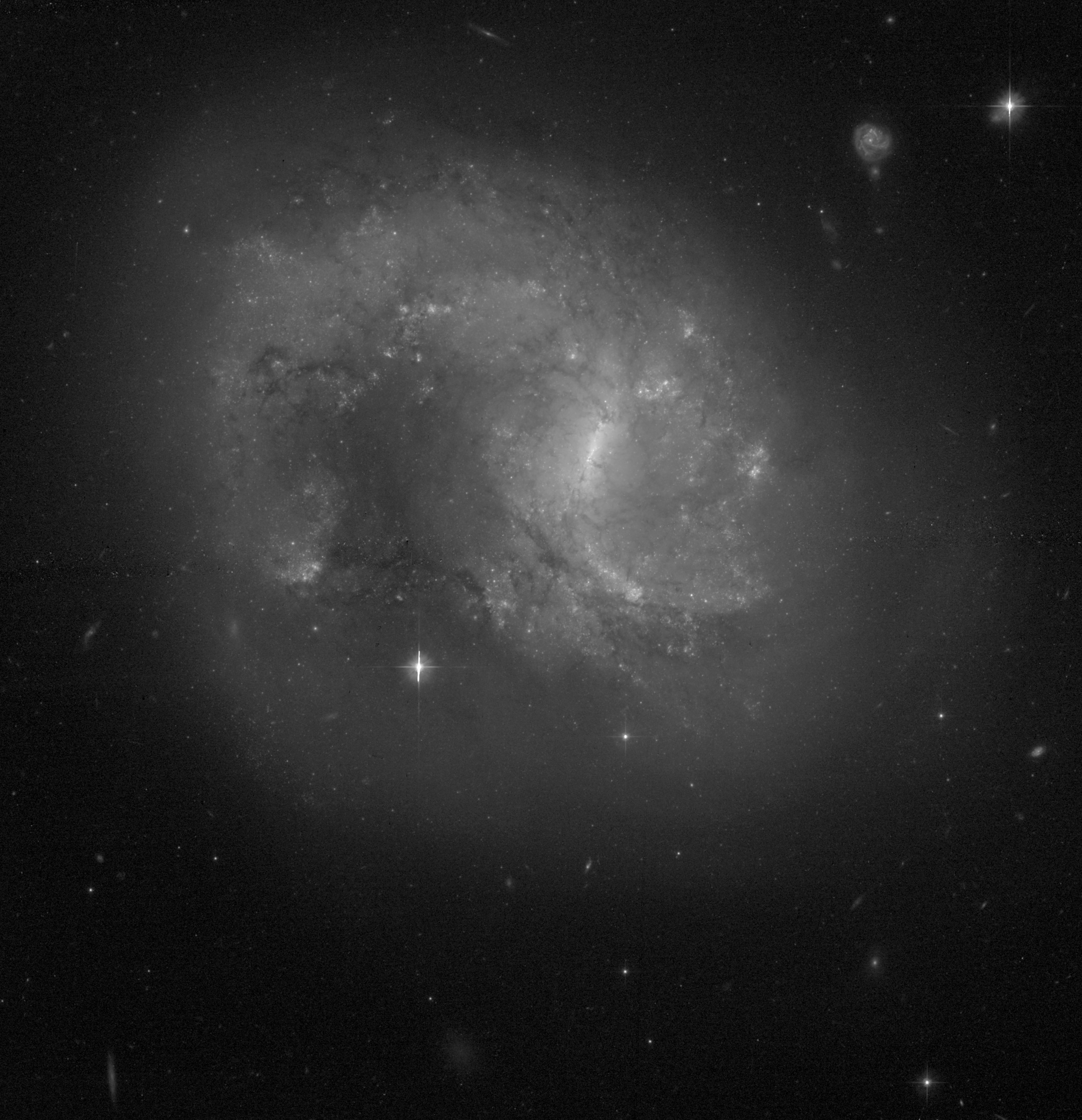
NGC 4027 imaged by the Hubble Space Telescope

== Galaxy group information ==
NGC 4027 is part of the NGC 4038 Group, a group of galaxies that also contains the Antennae Galaxies (NGC 4038/NGC 4039).

== See also ==
- NGC 4618 – a similar one-armed spiral galaxy
- NGC 4625 – a similar one-armed spiral galaxy
- NGC 5713 – a similar one-armed spiral galaxy
