= NGC 3818 =

Elliptical galaxy in the constellation Virgo

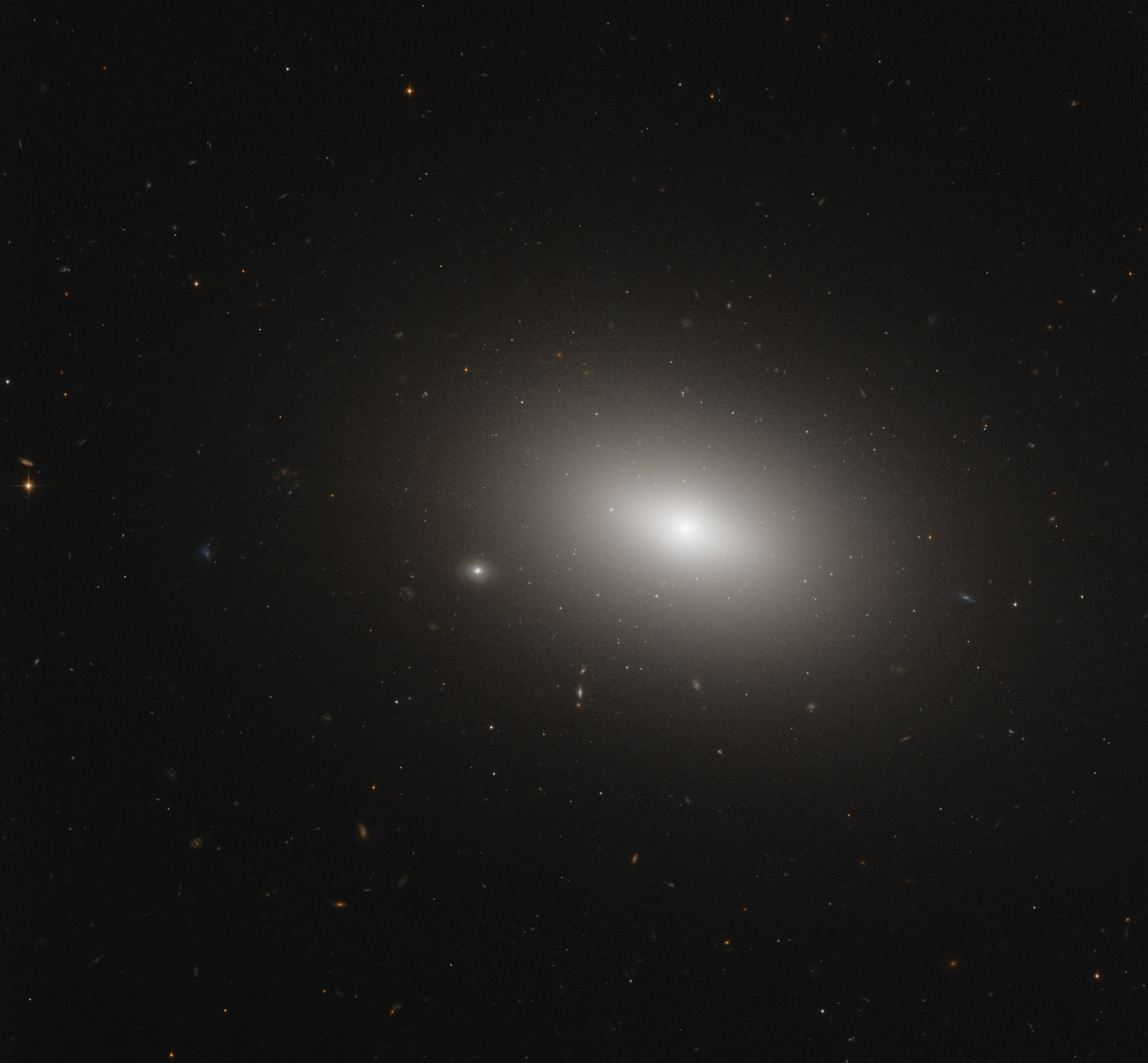
- Hubble Space Telescope image of NGC 3818

Observation data (J2000 epoch)
- Constellation: Virgo
- Right ascension: 11^{h} 41^{m} 57.35927^{s}
- Declination: −06° 09′ 20.4484″
- Distance: 118 ± 12 Mly (36.3 ± 3.6 Mpc)

Characteristics
- Type: E5
- Apparent size (V): 1.163′ × 0.768′

Other designations
- GSC 04937-00483, UGCA 243, LEDA 36304, MCG -01-30-023

NGC 3818 is an elliptical galaxy in the constellation Virgo. It is at a distance of about 118 million light-years away from Earth. In the center of NGC 3818 lies a supermassive black hole. NGC 3818 was discovered by William Herschel on March 5, 1785.
