= NGC 3981 =

Spiral galaxy in the constellation Crater

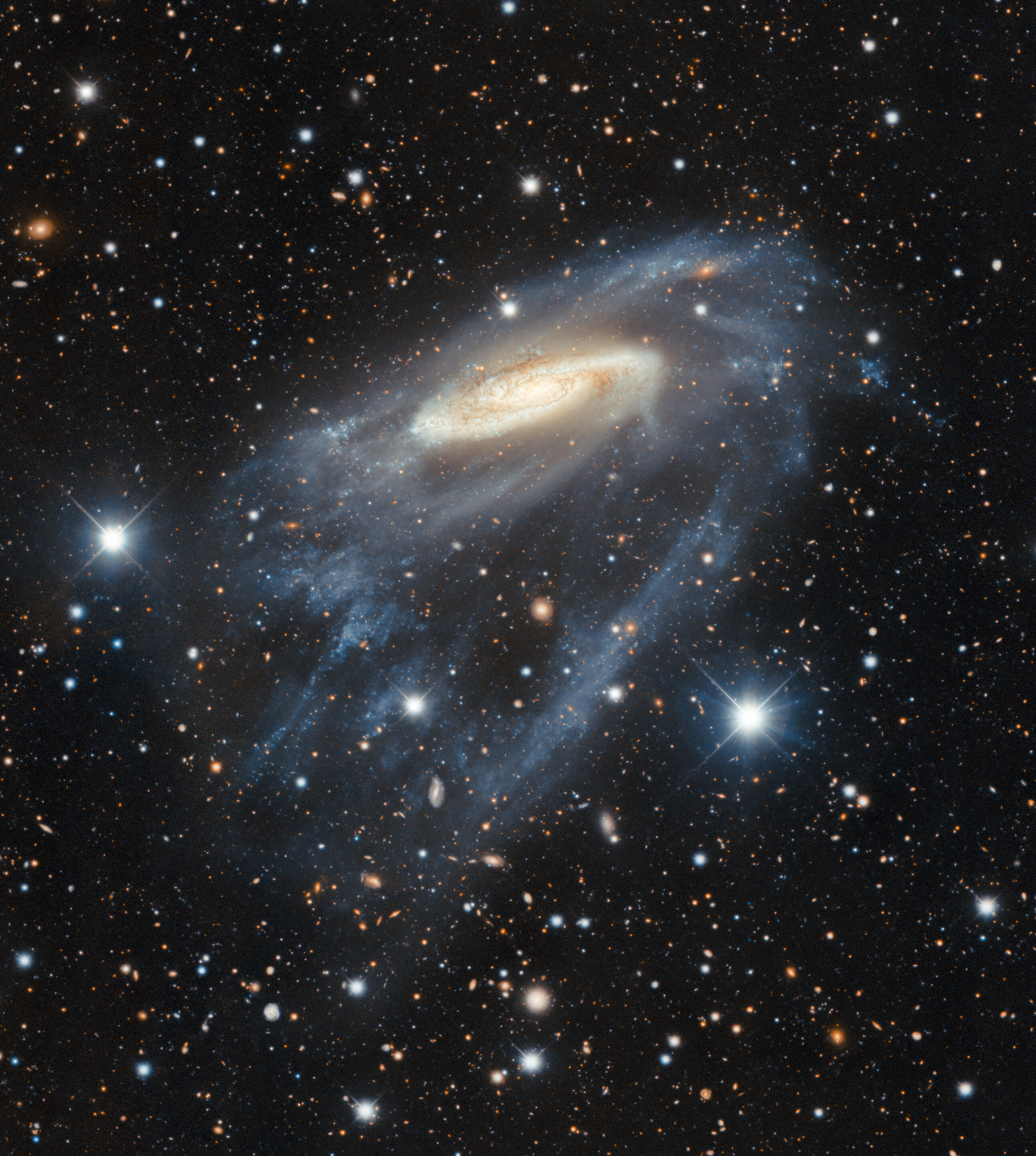
- NGC 3981 imaged by the DECam on the Víctor M. Blanco Telescope.

Observation data (J2000 epoch)
- Constellation: Crater
- Right ascension: 11^{h} 56^{m} 07.4552^{s}
- Declination: −19° 53′ 45.193″
- Redshift: 0.005747±0.0000130
- Heliocentric radial velocity: 1,723±4 km/s
- Distance: 65 Mly (19.9 Mpc)
- Group or cluster: NGC 4038 Group
- Apparent magnitude (B): 11.75

Characteristics
- Type: SA(rs)bc
- Size: ~269,200 ly (82.55 kpc) (estimated)
- Apparent size (V): 5.2′ × 2.3′

Other designations
- ESO 572- G 020, Arp 289, UGCA 255, MCG -03-31-001, PGC 037496, VV 008

NGC 3981 is a large unbarred spiral galaxy located in the constellation Crater. Its velocity with respect to the cosmic microwave background is 2,078±25 km/s, which corresponds to a Hubble distance of 100.0 ± 7.1 Mly (30.65 ± 2.18 Mpc). However, 14 non-redshift measurements give a closer mean distance of 67.54 ± 3.00 Mly (20.707 ± 0.920 Mpc). It was discovered by German-British astronomer William Herschel on February 7, 1785.

NGC 3981 is a member of the NGC 4038 Group which is part of the Virgo Supercluster.

== See also ==
- Galaxy
