= NGC 3585 =

Galaxy in the constellation Hydra

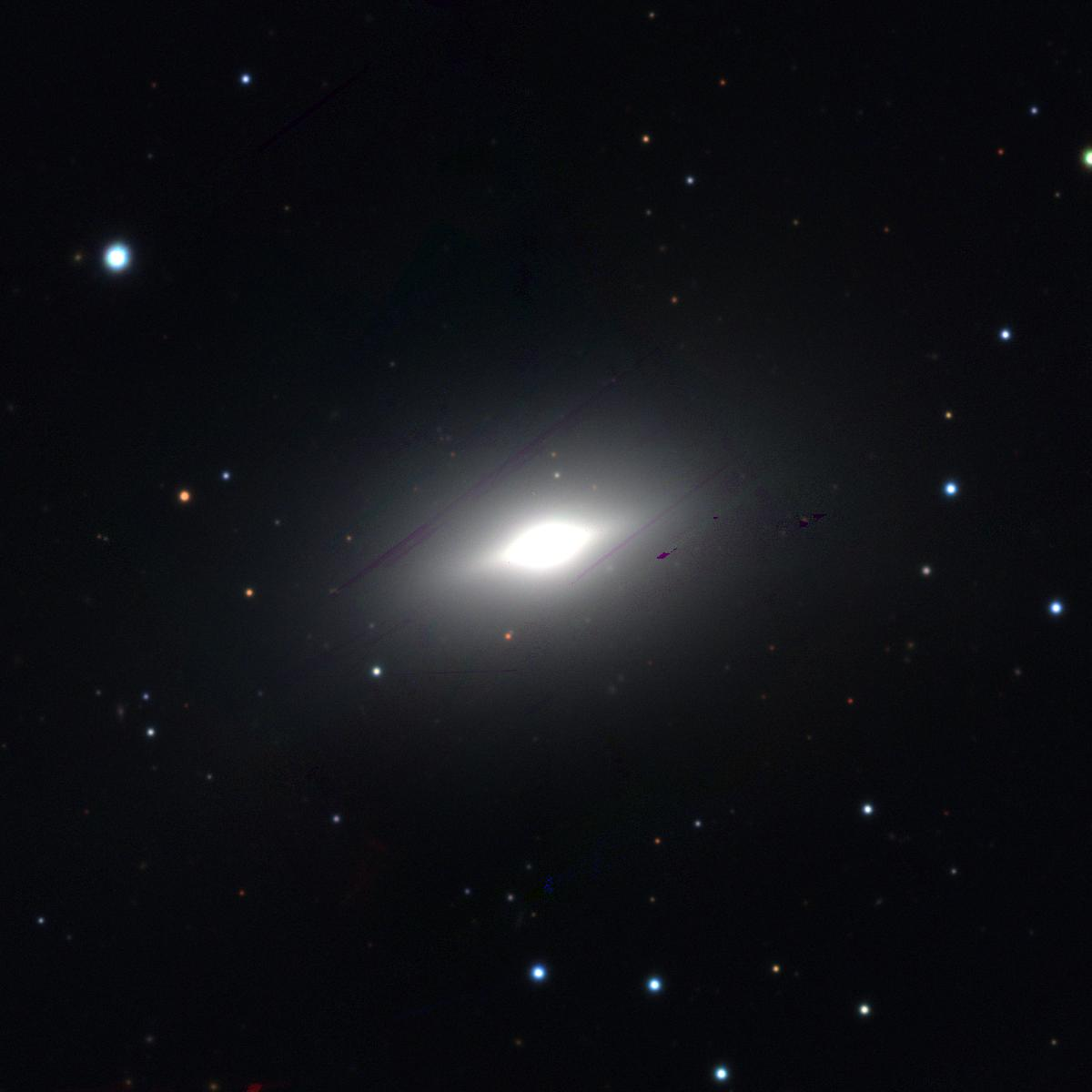
- NGC 3585 by PanSTARRS

Observation data (J2000 epoch)
- Constellation: Hydra
- Right ascension: 11^{h} 13^{m} 17.1^{s}
- Declination: −26° 45′ 17″
- Redshift: 0.004783 ± 0.000040
- Heliocentric radial velocity: 1,434 ± 12 km/s
- Distance: 56 ± 15 Mly (17.3 ± 4.5 Mpc)
- Apparent magnitude (V): 9.9

Characteristics
- Type: E7/S0
- Apparent size (V): 4.7′ × 2.6′

Other designations
- ESO 502- G 025, AM 1110-262, MCG -04-27-004, PGC 34160

NGC 3585 is an elliptical or a lenticular galaxy located in the constellation Hydra. It is located at a distance of circa 60 million light-years from Earth, which, given its apparent dimensions, means that NGC 3585 is about 80,000 light years across. It was discovered by William Herschel on December 9, 1784.

NGC 3585 features a red disc region in the core with a semi-major axis of circa 45 arcseconds, probably associated with diffuse dust. There are nearly 130 globular cluster candidates in the galaxy, with the total number of globular clusters estimated to be nearly 550. This number is quite low, but it is typical for field elliptical galaxies. Based on luminosity turnover of the globular clusters, it is suspected that there is a subpopulation of younger clusters. The outer isophotes of the galaxy are asymmetrical, maybe due to a tidal disruption.

In the centre of NGC 3585 lies a supermassive black hole whose mass is estimated to be 10^{8.4} M_{☉} based on the tidal disruption rate or 10^{8.53 ± 0.122} M_{☉} based on the observation of the circumnuclear ring with very-long-baseline interferometry. Based on observations by the Hubble Space Telescope to determine the stellar velocity dispersion at the core, the mass of the hole was estimated to be between 280 and 490 million M_{☉} by using the M–sigma relation.

NGC 3585 is the most prominent member of a loose galaxy group known as the NGC 3585 group or LGG 230. Other members of the group are the spiral galaxies UGCA 226, ESO 502- G 016, and UGCA 230.
