= NGC 3936 =

Galaxy in the constellation Cetus

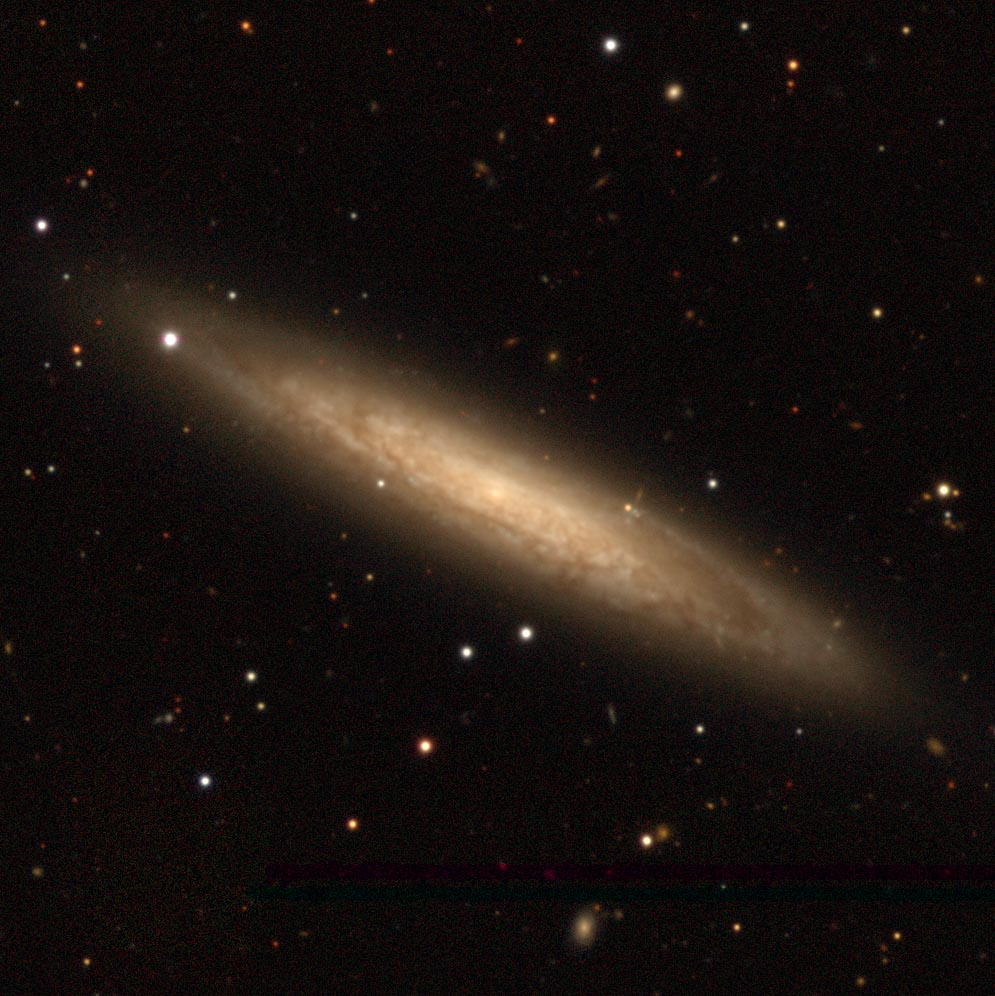
- NGC 3936 imaged by Legacy Surveys

Observation data (J2000 epoch)
- Constellation: Hydra
- Right ascension: 11^{h} 52^{m} 20.569^{s}
- Declination: −26° 54′ 21.553″
- Redshift: 0.006715
- Heliocentric radial velocity: 2013 ± 3 km/s
- Distance: 113.4 ± 8.0 Mly (34.76 ± 2.46 Mpc)
- Group or cluster: NGC 3936 Group (LGG 253)
- Apparent magnitude (V): 12.1

Characteristics
- Type: SB(s)bc? edge-on
- Size: ~113,300 ly (34.75 kpc) (estimated)
- Apparent size (V): 3.9′ × 0.7′

Other designations
- ESO 504- G 020, IRAS 11497-2637, 2MASX J11522059-2654211, UGCA 248, MCG -04-28-004, PGC 37178

NGC 3936 is a barred spiral galaxy in the constellation of Hydra. Its velocity with respect to the cosmic microwave background is 2,357 ± 24 km/s, which corresponds to a Hubble distance of 34.76 ± 2.46 Mpc (~113 million light-years). It was discovered by British astronomer John Herschel on 24 March 1835.

As of July 2024, 26 non-redshift measurements give a distance of 20.912 ± 2.969 Mpc (~68.2 million light-years), which is well outside the Hubble distance values. But, since this galaxy is relatively close to the Local Group, it is very likely that this value is closer to the true distance to NGC 3936.

== NGC 3936 Group ==
NGC 3936 is the largest of a small group of four galaxies named after it. The other three galaxies in the NGC 3936 group (also known as LGG 253) are NGC 3885, ESO 440–4, and ESO 440–11.

== Supernova ==
One supernova has been observed in NGC 3936: SN 2024phv (Type II, mag. 17.3523) was discovered by the Distance Less Than 40 Mpc Survey (DLT40) on 10 July 2024.

== See also ==
- List of NGC objects (3001–4000)
