= NGC 4033 =

Galaxy in the constellation Corvus

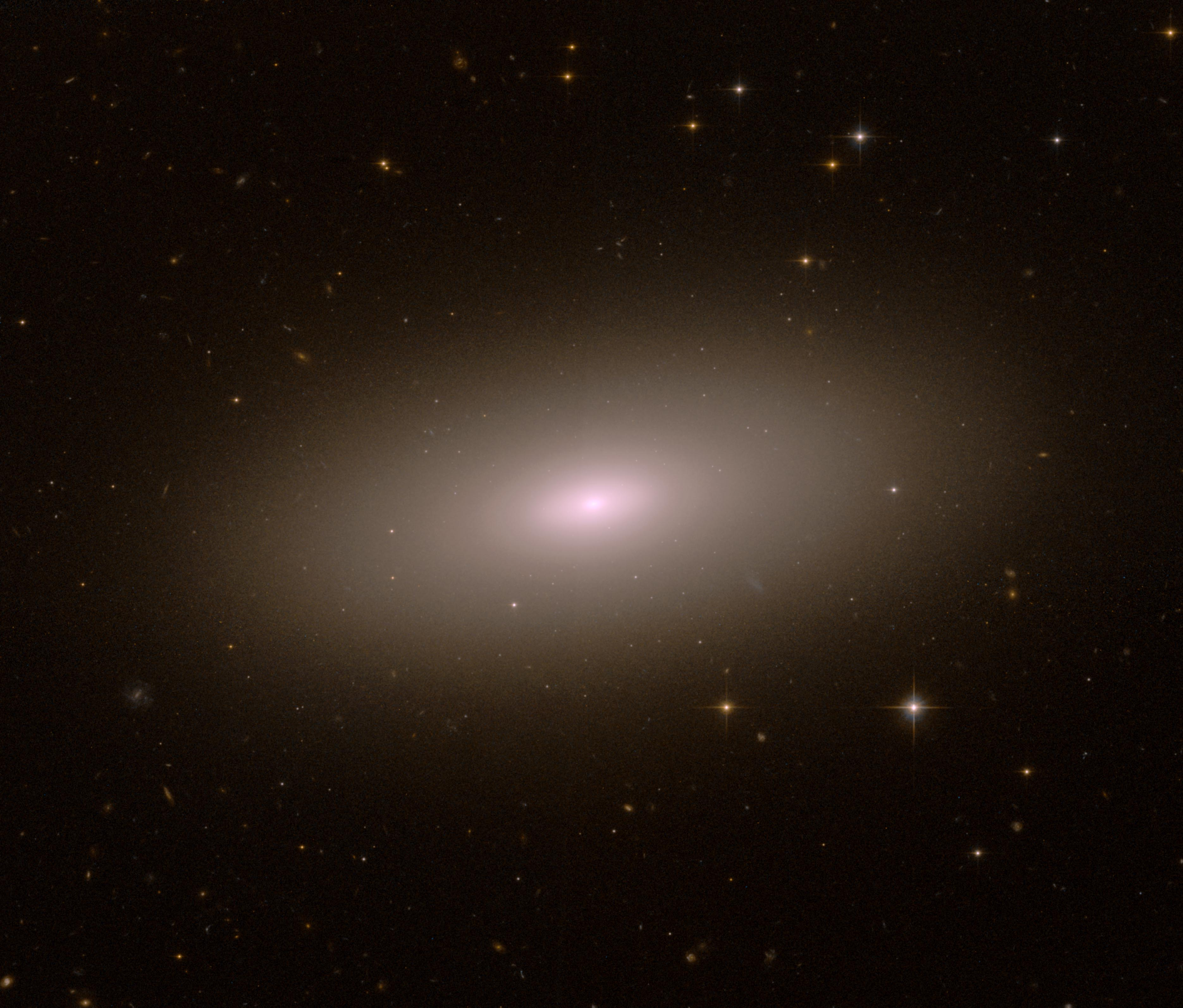
- Hubble Space Telescope image of NGC 4033

Observation data (J2000 epoch)
- Constellation: Corvus
- Right ascension: 12^{h} 00^{m} 34.7473^{s}
- Declination: −17° 50′ 33.405″
- Redshift: 0.005394
- Heliocentric radial velocity: 1617 km/s
- Distance: 73.73 ± 4.34 Mly (22.606 ± 1.331 Mpc)
- Apparent magnitude (V): 13.18

Characteristics
- Type: E6
- Apparent size (V): 2.25′ × 1.1′

Other designations
- PGC 37863, MCG -03-31-011

NGC 4033 is an elliptical galaxy located in the constellation Corvus. It was discovered on 31 December 1785, by William Herschel.

== Gallery ==
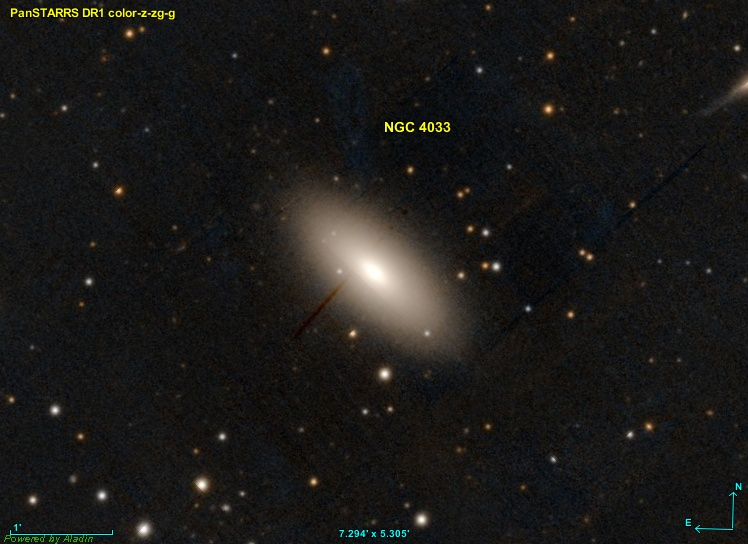
Pan-STARRS image of NGC 4033

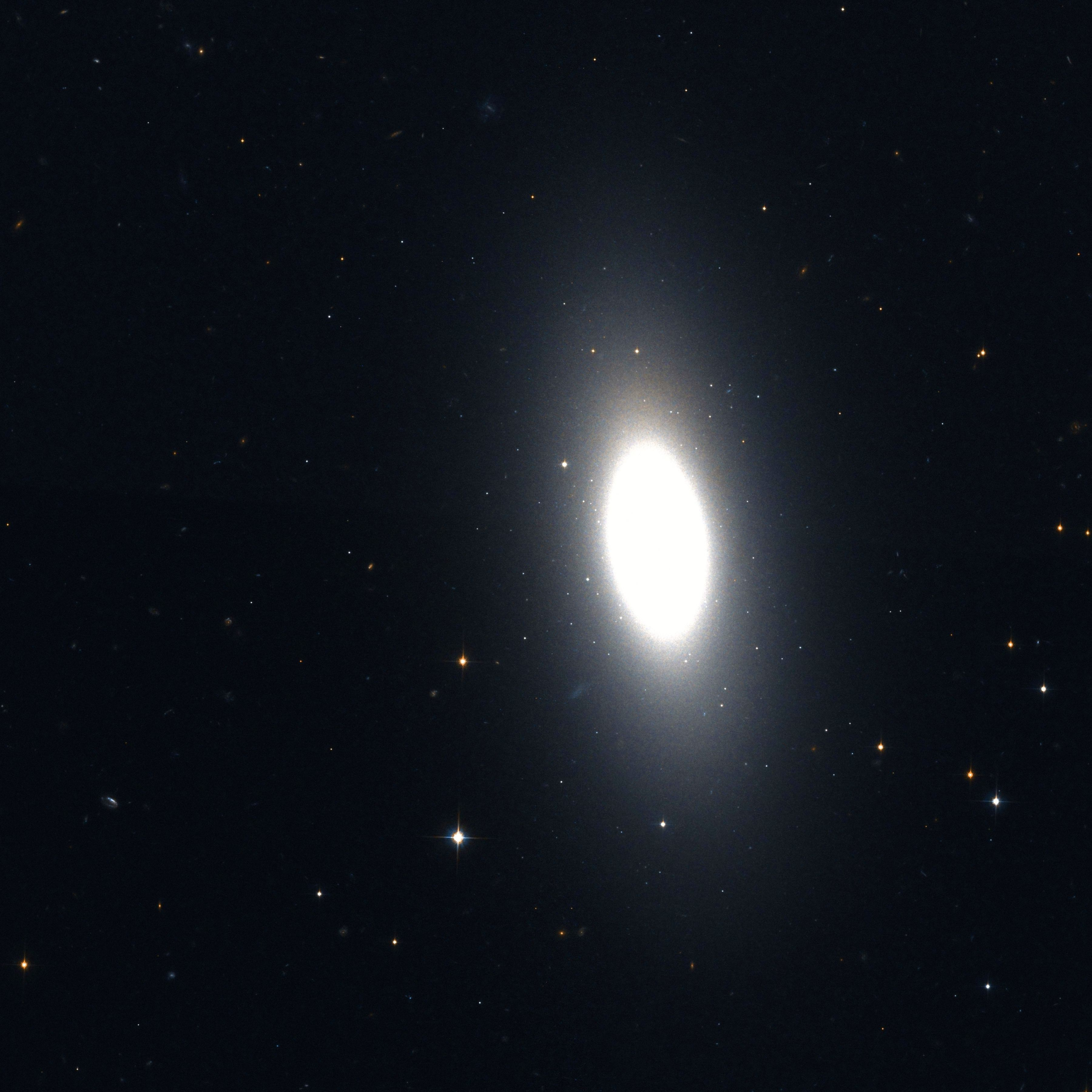
NGC 4033 galaxy by Hubble/WikiSky

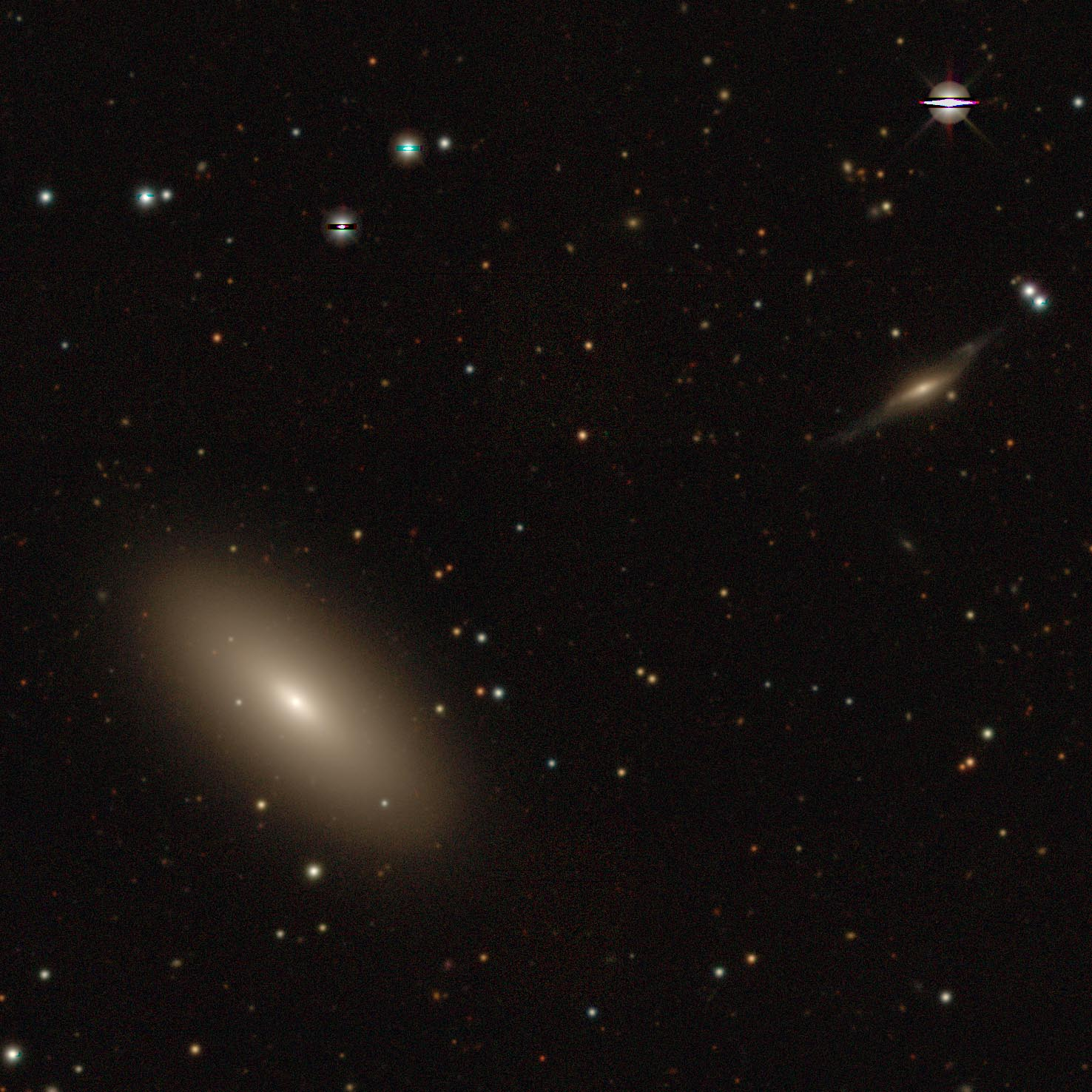
NGC 4033 and ESO 572-40 taken by Legacy Surveys
