= NGC 3904 =

Elliptical galaxy in the Hydra constellation

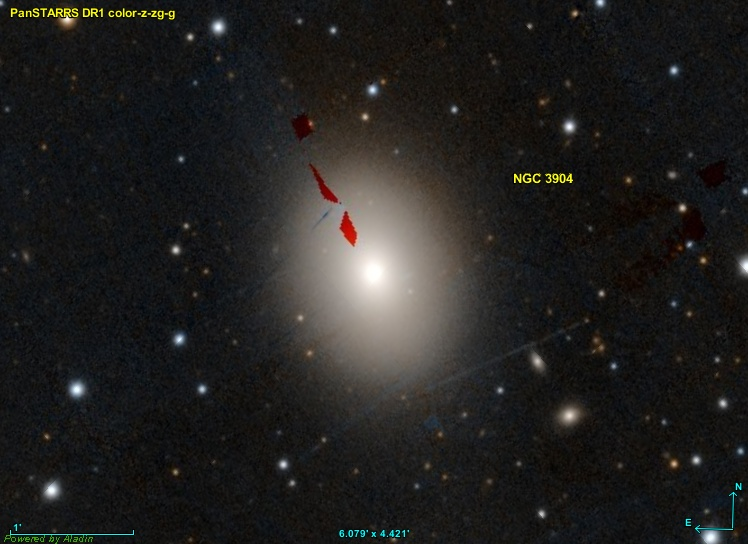

Observation data (J2000.0 epoch)
- Constellation: Hydra
- Right ascension: 11^{h} 49^{m} 13,2^{s}
- Declination: −29° 16′ 36″
- Redshift: 0.005257
- Heliocentric radial velocity: 1576 ± 8
- Distance: 72 million LY
- Apparent magnitude (V): 10.96

Characteristics
- Type: E2
- Apparent size (V): 2.70 x 2.0

Other designations
- PGC 36918

NGC 3904 is an elliptical galaxy in the constellation Hydra. It was observed both by astronomers William Herschel in 1791 and John Herschel in 1834, respectively. The galaxy's radial velocity, relative to the cosmic microwave background is measured at around 1915 ± 25 km/s, corresponding to a Hubble distance of around 28.25 ± 2.02 MPC.

== Characteristics ==
NGC 3904 exhibits no detectable neutral hydrogen or radio emissions, indicating a lack of ongoing star formation. It also hosts a system of globular clusters with relatively lower metallicity and bluer colors than those in bigger elliptical galaxies.

== Supernova ==
One supernova has been observed within the galaxy NGC 3904:

- SN 1971C (type unknown, mag. 15.3) was discovered by Glenn Jolly on January 31, 1971.

== See also ==
- List of NGC objects (3001–4000)
