= NGC 3717 =

Spiral galaxy in the constellation Hydra

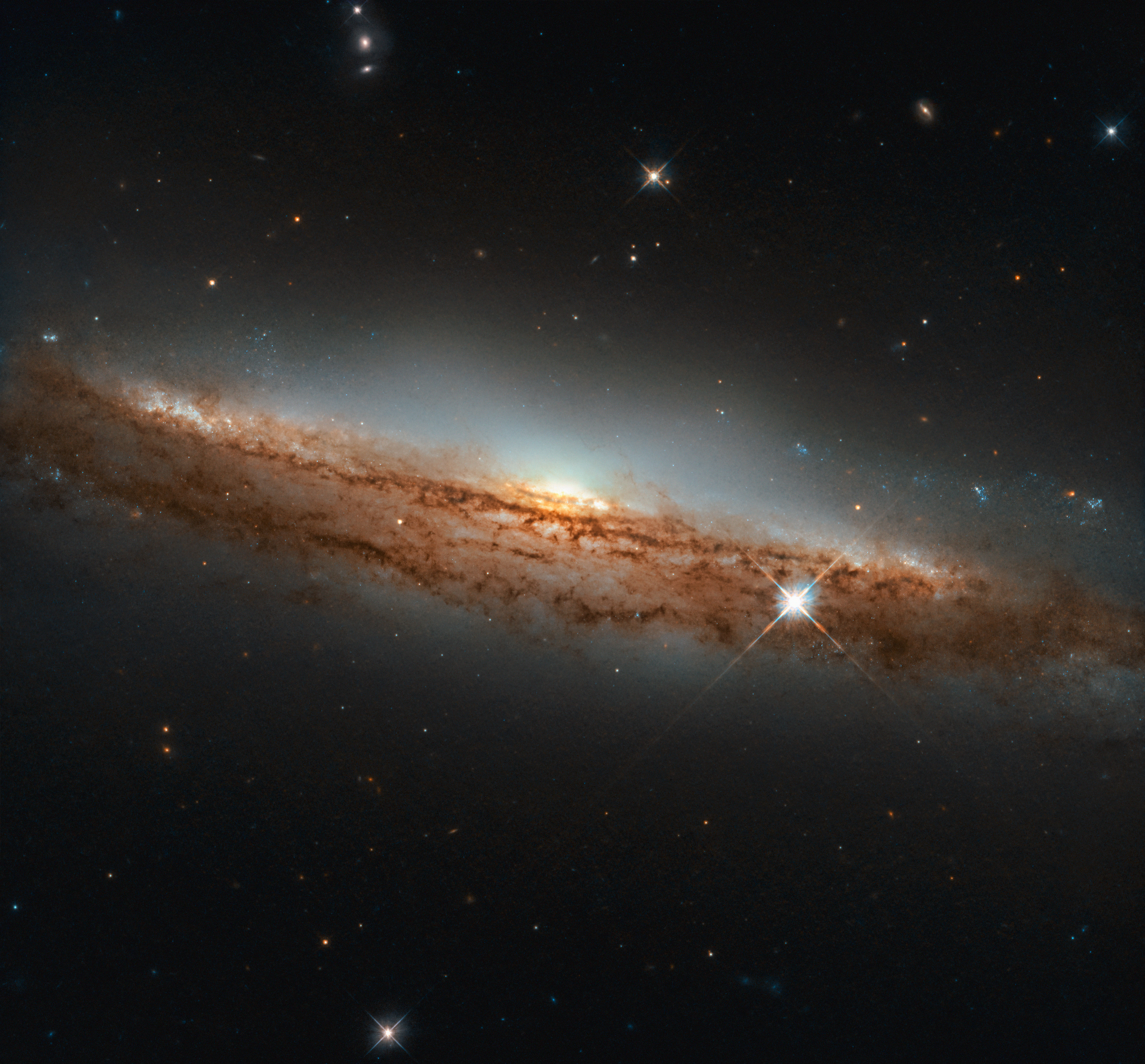
- NGC 3717 taken by Hubble Space Telescope.

Observation data (J2000 epoch)
- Constellation: Hydra
- Right ascension: 11^{h} 31^{m} 31.992^{s}
- Declination: −30° 18′ 27.86″
- Redshift: 0.005780
- Heliocentric radial velocity: 1727.8km/s
- Distance: 81.43 Mly
- Apparent magnitude (B): 12.21

Characteristics
- Type: Sb

Other designations
- AM 1129-300, 6dFGS gJ113131.9-301828, ESO 439-15, ESO-LV 439-0150, FLASH J113131.73-301827.9, HIPASS J1131-30, IRAS 11290-3001, IRAS F11290-3001, LEDA 35539, 2MASX J11313199-3018278, MCG-05-27-015, NVSS J113131-301828, PSCz Q11290-3001, SGC 112903-3001.9, UGCA 238, [CHM2007] LDC 811 J113131.99-3018278, [M98c] 112903.0-300154

NGC 3717 is a spiral galaxy located in the constellation of Hydra at an approximate distance of 81.43 million light years. NGC 3717 was discovered in 1834 by Sir John Herschel.

== See also ==
- Spiral galaxy
