= Antennae Galaxies =

Galaxies in the constellation Corvus

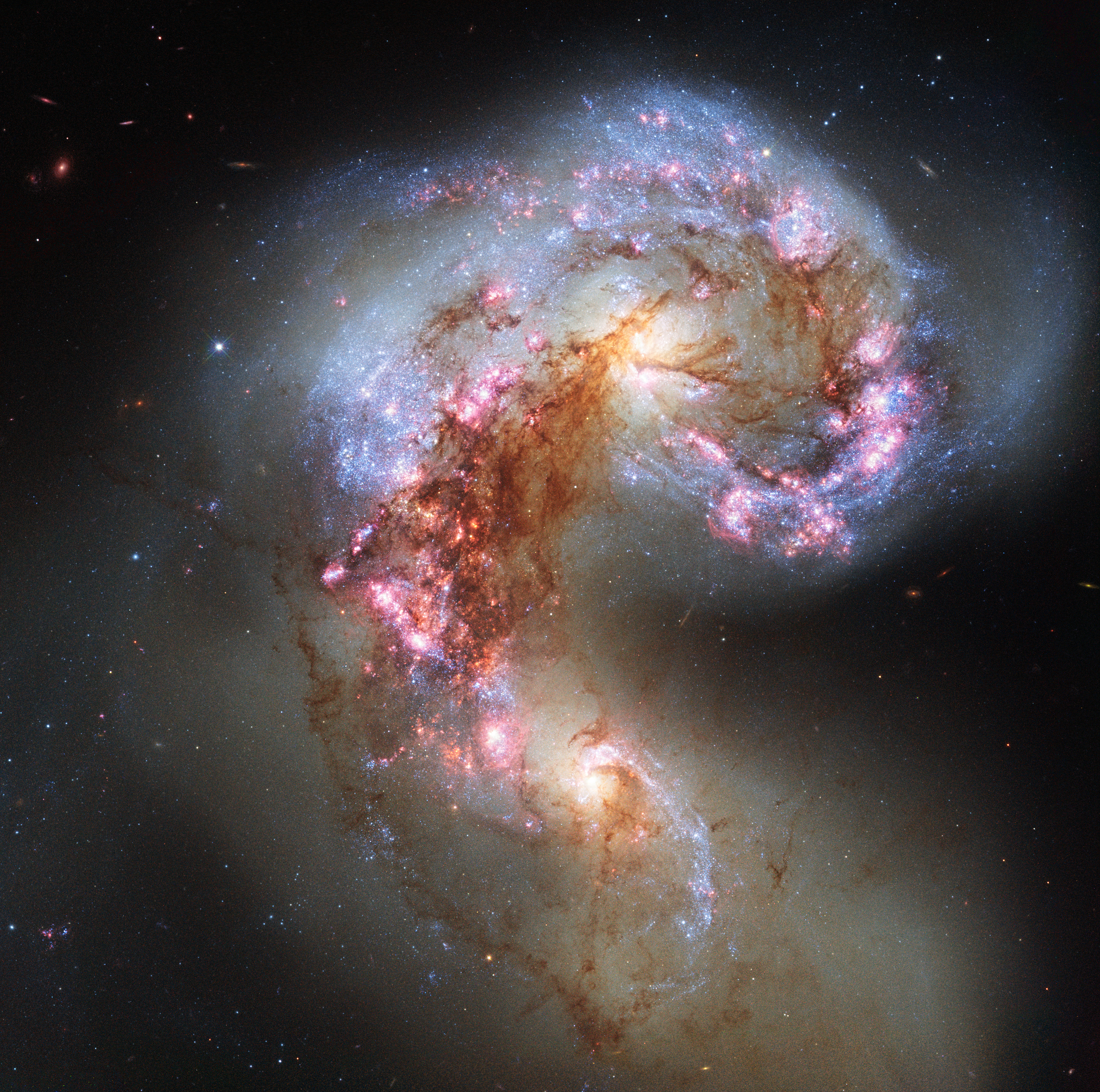
- Hubble Space Telescope image of NGC 4038 (top) and NGC 4039 (bottom)

Observation data (J2000 epoch)
- Constellation: Corvus
- Right ascension: 12^{h} 01^{m} 53.0^{s} / 12^{h} 01^{m} 53.5^{s}
- Declination: −18° 52′ 03″ / −18° 53′ 10″
- Redshift: 0.005417±0.000017 / 0.005474±0.000030
- Heliocentric radial velocity: 1,624±5 km/s / 1,641±9 km/s
- Galactocentric velocity: 1,467±8 km/s / 1,484±11 km/s
- Distance: 71.75 ± 9.785 Mly (22 ± 3 Mpc)
- Apparent magnitude (V): 11.2 / 11.08

Characteristics
- Type: SB(s)m pec / SA(s)m pecLINERSbrst
- Size: 634,410 ly × 456,780 ly (194.51 kpc × 140.05 kpc) (diameter; 27.0 B-mag arcsec^{−2}) (Note: The quick-look major axis physical diameters given by NED of 194.51 by 140.05 kiloparsecs (634,000 by 457,000 light-years) for NGC 4038 and 79.20 by 36.43 kiloparsecs (258,000 by 119,000 light-years) for NGC 4039 were based on distance estimates of 21.056 ± 3.941 Mpc (68.68×10^{6} ± 12.85×10^{6} ly) and 20.943 ± 4.484 Mpc (68.31×10^{6} ± 14.62×10^{6} ly) using scales of 102.1 parsec/arcsec and 101.5 parsec/arcsec multiplied with given angular diameters.) / 258,320 ly × 118,820 ly (79.20 kpc × 36.43 kpc) (diameter; 25.5 B-mag arcsec^{−2})
- Apparent size (V): 5.2′ × 3.1′ / 3.1′ × 1.6′
- Notable features: Interacting galaxies

Other designations
- Ringtail Galaxy, NGC 4038 / 4039, PGC 37967 / 37969, Arp 244, Caldwell 60/61, UGCA 264/265

The Antennae Galaxies (also known as NGC 4038/NGC 4039 or Caldwell 60/Caldwell 61) are a pair of interacting galaxies in the constellation Corvus. They are currently going through a starburst phase, in which the collision of clouds of gas and dust, with entangled magnetic fields, causes rapid star formation. They were discovered by William Herschel in 1785.

== General information ==
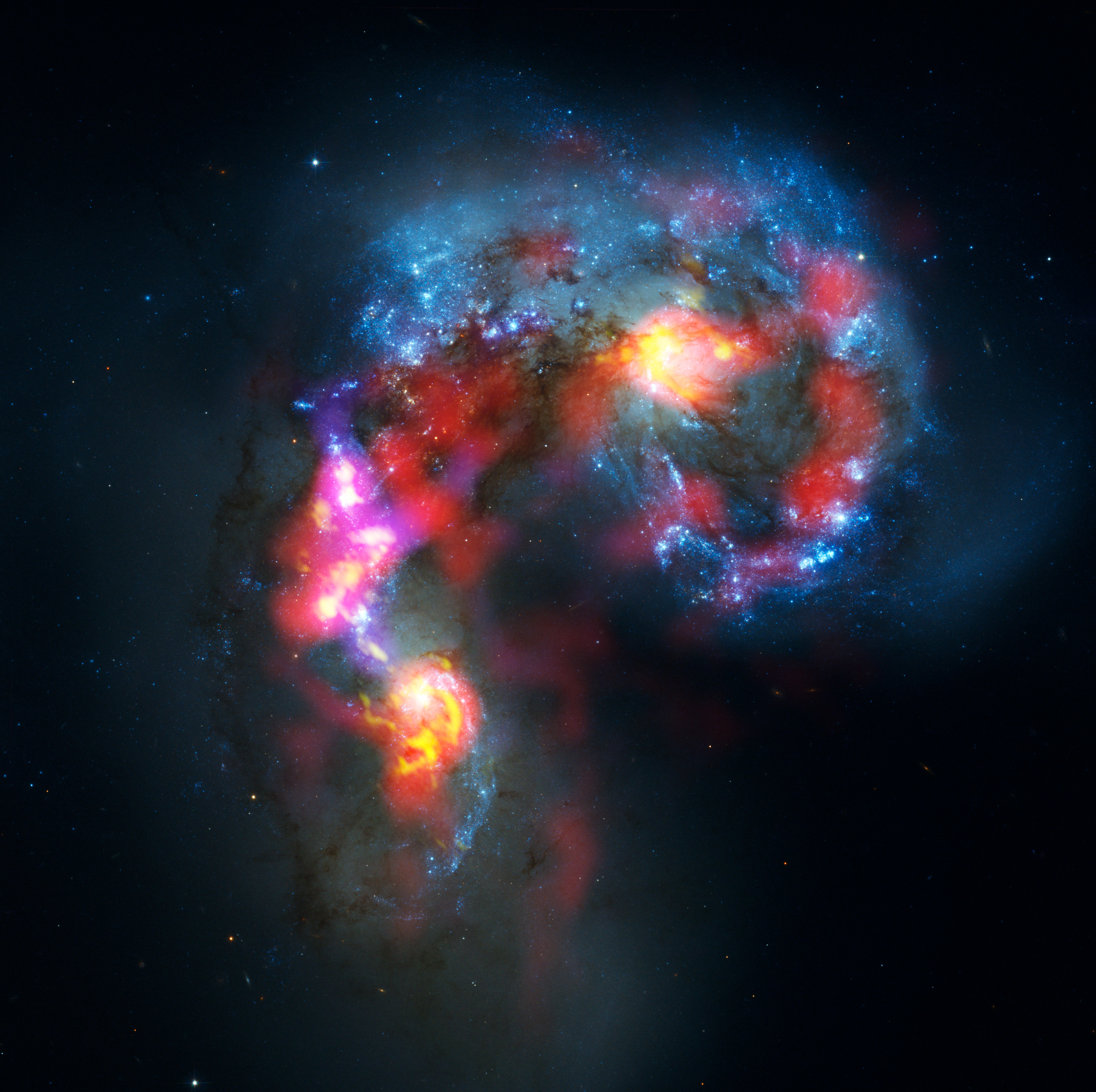
Visible light Hubble image (blue) showing newly formed young stars overlaid with a radio image from the Atacama Large Millimeter Array showing the clouds of dense cold gas from which new stars form (red, pink and yellow)

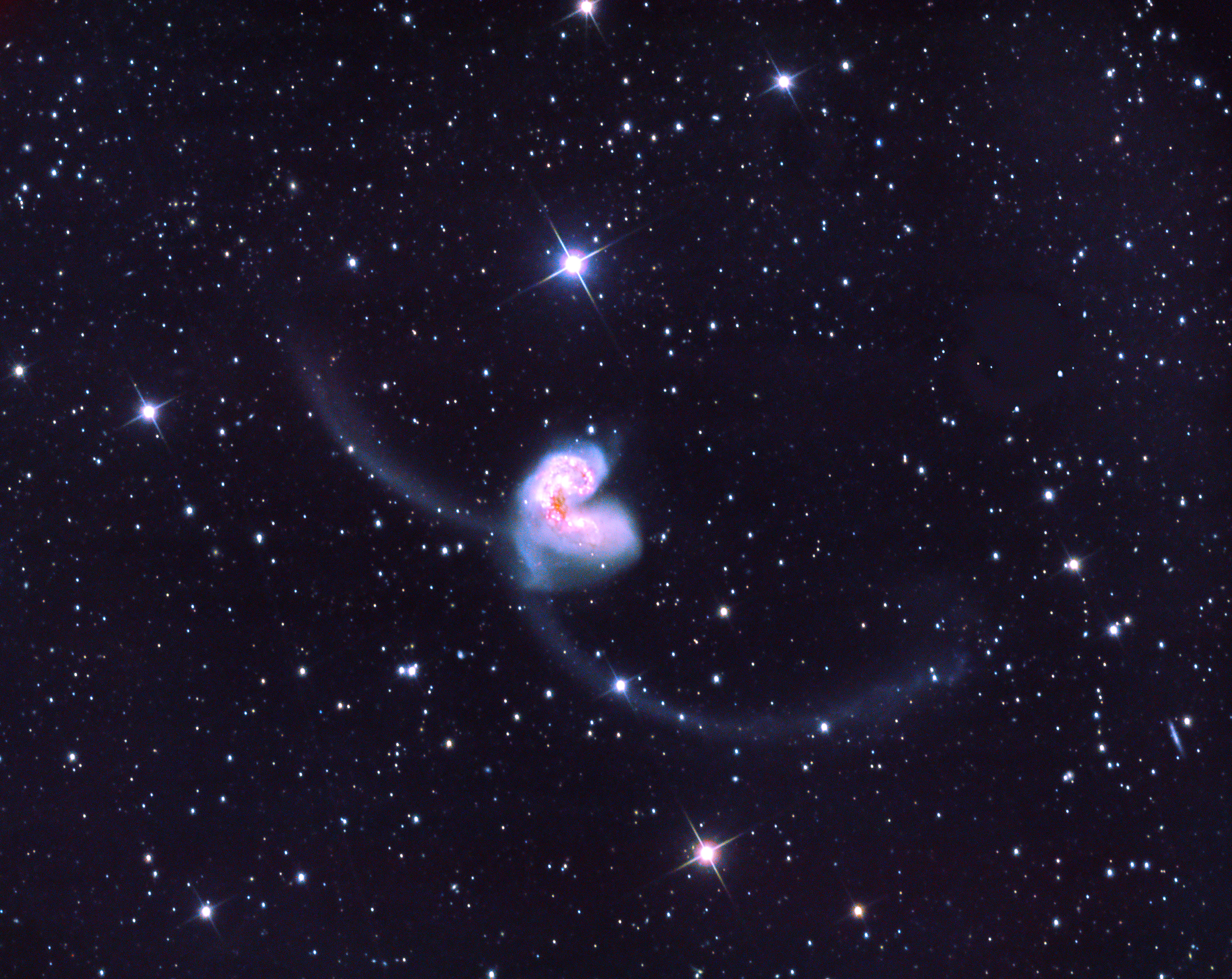
Streams of stars and dust, resembling insect antennae, being ejected from both galaxies. The name Antennae Galaxies comes from this resemblance.

The Antennae Galaxies are undergoing a galactic collision. These interacting galaxies are located 0.25° north of 31 Crateris and 3.25° southwest of Gamma Corvi.

Located in the NGC 4038 group with five other galaxies, these two galaxies are known as the Antennae Galaxies because the two long tails of stars, gas and dust ejected from the galaxies as a result of the collision resemble an insect's antennae.

The nuclei of the two galaxies are joining to become one giant galaxy. Most galaxies probably undergo at least one significant collision in their lifetimes. This might be the future of our Milky Way with a 50 percent chance of colliding with the Andromeda Galaxy. This collision and merger sequence (the Toomre sequence) for galaxy evolution was developed in part by successfully modeling the Antennae Galaxies' "antennae" in particular.

The Antennae galaxies also contain a relatively young collection of massive globular clusters that were possibly formed as a result of the collision between the two galaxies. The young age of these clusters is in contrast to the average age of most known globular clusters (which are around 12 billion years old), with the formation of the globulars likely originating from shockwaves, generated by the collision of the galaxies, compressing large, massive molecular clouds. The densest regions of the collapsing and compressing clouds are believed to be the birthplace of the clusters.

NGC 4038 has many Cepheid variables, around 53 of them.

== Distance ==
The Antennae Galaxies are widely accepted to be located at roughly 20 megaparsecs (70 million light-years) from Earth. However, a 2008 study stated that they are less remote from the Milky Way than previously thought—at 13.3 ± 1.0 megaparsec (43.4 ± 3.26 million light-years) based on photometry of the presumed tip of the red-giant branch, but an immediate paper later found three major issues regarding this estimate and considered it to be a probable misidentification of the tip of the red-giant branch. An average distance estimate of 22 ± 3 megaparsecs (71.8 ± 9.78 million light-years) has been also calculated based on observations of the Type Ia SN 2007sr in the southern tail using Las Campanas Observatory, the large-scale flow model, reanalyzing Hubble Space Telescope data in the Archive with an improved method, finding a fainter tip of the red-giant branch.

== Supernovae ==
Four supernovae have been observed in NGC 4038.

- SN 1974E (type unknown, mag. 14) was discovered by Miklós Lovas on 21 March 1974.
- SN 2004gt (Type Ic, mag. 14.9) was discovered by Berto Monard on 12 December 2004.
- SN 2007sr (Type Ia, mag. 12.9) was discovered by the Catalina Sky Survey on 18 December 2007.
- SN 2013dk (Type Ic, mag. 15.8) was discovered by the CHASE Project (CHilean Automatic Supernovas sEarch) on 22 June 2013.

One supernova has been found in NGC 4039.

- SN 1921A (type unknown, mag. 16) was discovered by Edwin Hubble and John Charles Duncan in March 1921.

== Timeline ==
About 1.2 billion years ago, the Antennae were two separate galaxies. NGC 4038 was a barred spiral galaxy and NGC 4039 was a spiral galaxy. 900 million years ago, the Antennae began to approach one another, looking similar to NGC 2207 and IC 2163. 600 million years ago, the Antennae passed through each other, looking like the Mice Galaxies. 300 million years ago, the Antennae's stars began to be released from both galaxies. Today the two streamers of ejected stars extend far beyond the original galaxies, resulting in the antennae shape.

Within 400 million years, the Antennae's nuclei will collide and become a single core with stars, gas, and dust around it. Observations and simulations of colliding galaxies (e.g., by Alar Toomre) suggest that the Antennae Galaxies will eventually form an elliptical galaxy.

== X-ray source ==
Areas containing large amounts of neon (Ne), magnesium (Mg), and silicon (Si) were found when the Chandra X-ray Observatory analyzed the Antennae Galaxies. Heavy elements such as these are necessary in order for planets that may contain life (as we know it) to form. The clouds imaged contain 16 times as much magnesium and 24 times as much silicon as the Sun.

== See also ==
- Whirlpool Galaxy
- List of largest galaxies
