= HR 4699 =

Star in the constellation Corvus

Observation data Epoch J2000 Equinox ICRS
- Constellation: Corvus
- Right ascension: 12^{h} 20^{m} 55.71287^{s}
- Declination: –13° 33′ 56.6100″
- Apparent magnitude (V): +5.14

Characteristics
- Spectral type: K0 III
- U−B color index: +0.93
- B−V color index: +1.048±0.003

Astrometry
Radial velocity (R_{v})	+14.0±0.7 km/s
Proper motion (μ)	RA: –4.93 mas/yr Dec.: +9.86 mas/yr
Parallax (π)	16.21±0.29 mas
Distance	201 ± 4 ly (62 ± 1 pc)
Absolute magnitude (M_{V})	1.18

Details
Mass	1.76 M_{☉}
Radius	9.92+0.11 −0.16 R_{☉}
Luminosity	43±1 L_{☉}
Surface gravity (log g)	3.01 cgs
Temperature	4,707+38 −27 K
Metallicity [Fe/H]	0.00±0.05 dex
Rotational velocity (v sin i)	0.0 km/s
Age	1.97 Gyr

Other designations
- BD–12°3614, HD 107418, HIP 60221, HR 4699, SAO 157226

Database references
SIMBAD	data

HR 4699 is a single star in the southern constellation of Corvus. It is orange in hue and is dimly visible to the naked eye with an apparent visual magnitude of +5.14. This star is located at a distance of approximately 201 light years from the Sun based on parallax. It is drifting further away with a radial velocity of +14 km/s, after come to within 45.1 light-years some four million years ago.

This is an aging giant star with a stellar classification of K0 III, having exhausted the supply of hydrogen at its core then cooled and expanded to almost ten times the Sun's radius. It is nearly two billion years old with 1.76 times the mass of the Sun. The star is radiating 43 times the luminosity of the Sun from its photosphere at an effective temperature of 4,707 K.
