= 34 Boötis =

Star in the constellation of Boötes

- Location of 34 Boötis (circled in red)

Observation data Epoch J2000 Equinox ICRS
- Constellation: Boötes
- Right ascension: 14^{h} 43^{m} 25.36304^{s}
- Declination: +26° 31′ 40.2663″
- Apparent magnitude (V): 4.49 - 5.40

Characteristics
- Evolutionary stage: AGB
- Spectral type: M3− III
- B−V color index: 1.672±0.006
- Variable type: Semi-regular

Astrometry
Radial velocity (R_{v})	+5.60±0.49 km/s
Proper motion (μ)	RA: −13.57 mas/yr Dec.: −16.08 mas/yr
Parallax (π)	4.63±0.28 mas
Distance	700 ± 40 ly (220 ± 10 pc)
Absolute magnitude (M_{V})	−1.86

Details
Mass	2.20±0.23 M_{☉}
Radius	129.36+8.42 −7.49 R_{☉}
Luminosity	2,802±367 L_{☉}
Surface gravity (log g)	1.24 cgs
Temperature	3,691±50 K
Age	1.05±0.27 Gyr

Other designations
- Alrumh, 34 Boo, W Boötis, BD+27°2413, FK5 1383, GC 19831, HD 129712, HIP 71995, HR 5490, SAO 83488

Database references
SIMBAD	data

34 Boötis, also named Alrumh, is a single variable star in the northern constellation Boötes, located around 700 light years away from the Sun. At that distance, the visual magnitude of the star is diminished by an extinction of 0.49±0.02 due to interstellar dust. It has the variable star designation W Boötis; 34 Boötis is the Flamsteed designation. This object is visible to the naked eye as a faint, red-hued star with an apparent visual magnitude of around five. It is moving away from the Earth with a heliocentric radial velocity of +5.6 km/s.

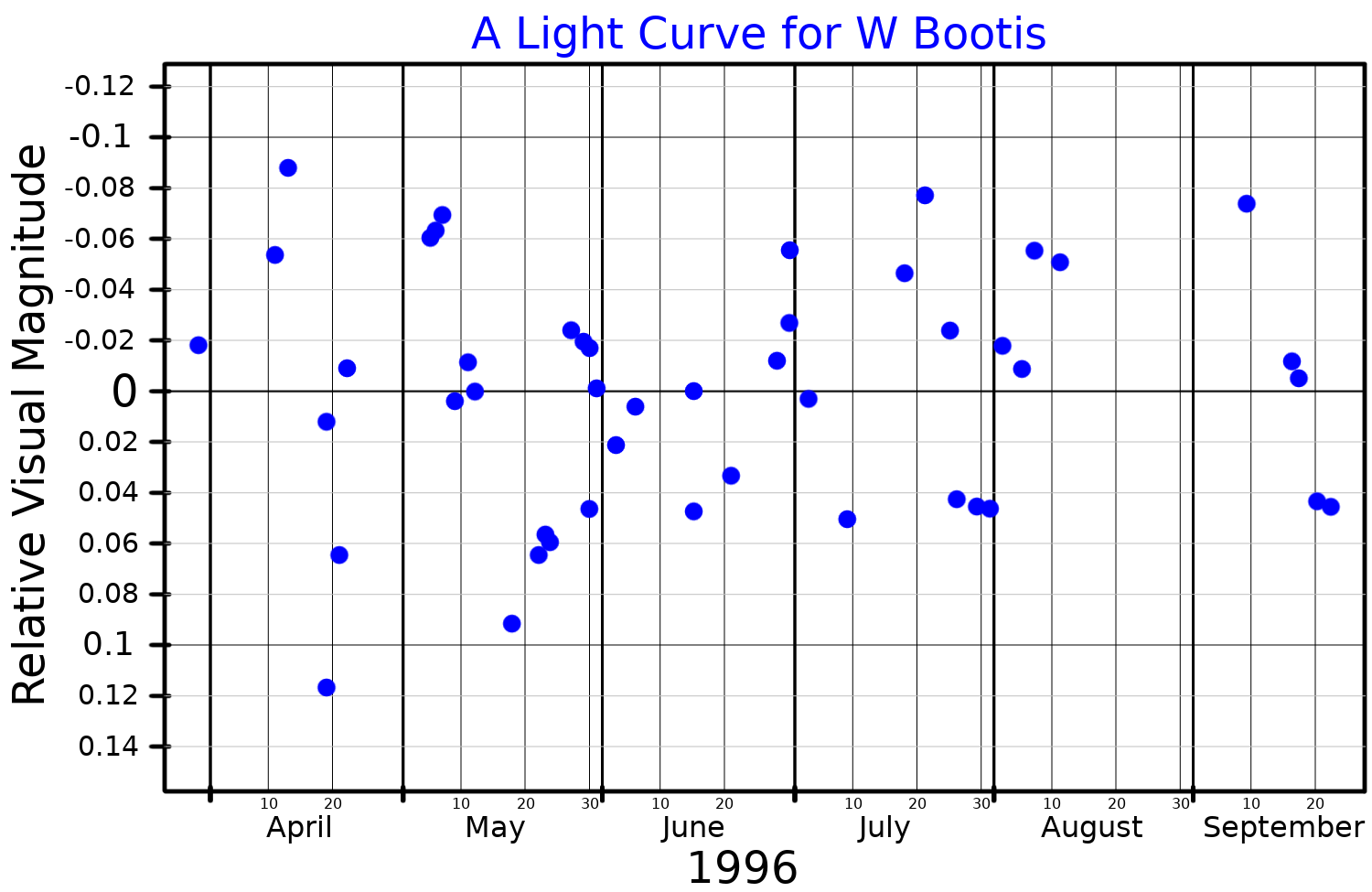
The visual band light curve of W Boötis, adapted from Percy et al. (1997)

This is an aging red giant star with a stellar classification of M3− III, which indicates it has exhausted the supply of hydrogen at its core and evolved off the main sequence branch. It is classified as a semiregular variable with a brightness that varies from magnitude +4.49 down to +5.4 with a period of 25 days, with some evidence of longer term variation and mode switching. The star is around a billion years old with 2.2 times the mass of the Sun and has expanded to 129 times the size of the Sun. It is radiating 2,802 times the luminosity of the Sun from its enlarged photosphere at an effective temperature of 3,691 K.

The parallax calculated in the new Hipparcos reduction is 4.63±0.28 mas, and in Gaia Data Release 2 the parallax is given as 6.3168±0.2900 max. Each has a margin of error of about 5%, but they differ from each other by far more than 5%.

Al-Rumḥ (الرُّمْح), the Lance, is an Arabic asterism in the area of ε Boötis (Izar), η Boötis (Muphrid), σ Boötis (Genghe), and υ Boötis. 34 Boötis is a star in this area near the otherwise-named ε Boötis. The IAU Working Group on Star Names approved the name Alrumh for this star on 15 April 2026.
