= Boötes =

Constellation in the northern celestial hemisphere

- Constellation
- List of stars in Boötes
- Abbreviation: Boo
- Genitive: Boötis
- Pronunciation: /boʊˈoʊtiːz/, genitive /boʊˈoʊtɪs/
- Symbolism: The Herdsman
- Right ascension: 13^{h} 36.1^{m} –15^{h} 49.3^{m}
- Declination: +7.36°–+55.1°
- Area: 907 sq. deg. (13th)
- Main stars: 7, 15
- Bayer/Flamsteed stars: 59
- Stars brighter than 3.00^{m}: 3
- Stars within 10.00 pc (32.62 ly): 3
- Brightest star: Arcturus (α Boo) (−0.04^{m})
- Nearest star: Gliese 526
- Messier objects: 0
- Meteor showers: June Bootids; Quadrantids
- Bordering constellations: Draco; Ursa Major; Canes Venatici; Coma Berenices; Virgo; Serpens Caput; Corona Borealis; Hercules
- Visible at latitudes between +90° and −35°. Best visible at 21:00 (9 p.m.) during the month of June. Other designations: Arctophylax

Boötes (/boʊˈoʊtiːz/ boh-OH-teez) is a constellation in the northern sky, located between 0° and +60° declination, and 13 and 16 hours of right ascension on the celestial sphere. The name comes from Latin: Boōtēs, which comes from Ancient Greek: Βοώτης, romanized: Boṓtēs 'herdsman' or 'plowman' (literally, 'ox-driver'; from βοῦς boûs 'cow').

One of the 48 constellations described by the 2nd-century astronomer Ptolemy, Boötes is now one of the 88 modern constellations. It contains the fourth-brightest star in the night sky, the orange giant Arcturus, which is also the brightest star in the northern celestial hemisphere. Epsilon Boötis, or Izar, is a colourful multiple star popular with amateur astronomers. Boötes is home to many other bright stars, including eight above the fourth magnitude and an additional 21 above the fifth magnitude, making a total of 29 stars easily visible to the naked eye.

== History and mythology ==
Boötes may have been represented by the animal foreleg constellation in ancient Egypt, resembling that of an ox sufficiently to have been originally proposed as the "foreleg of ox" by Berio.

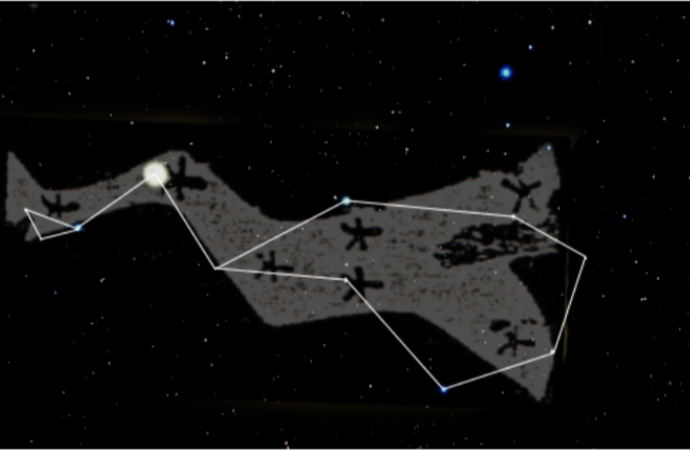
The constellation of Boötes overlaid on the ancient Egyptian foreleg constellation

Boötes is mentioned in the Odyssey as a celestial reference for maritime navigation, describing it as "late-setting" or "slow to set". Exactly whom Boötes is supposed to represent in Greek mythology is not clear. According to one version, he was a son of Demeter, Philomenus, twin brother of Plutus, a plowman who drove the oxen in the constellation Ursa Major. This agrees with the constellation's name. The ancient Greeks saw the asterism now called the "Big Dipper" or "Plough" as a cart with oxen. Some myths say that Boötes invented the plow and was memorialized for his ingenuity as a constellation.

Another myth associated with Boötes by Hyginus is that of Icarius, who was schooled as a grape farmer and winemaker by Dionysus. Icarius made wine so strong that those who drank it appeared poisoned, which caused shepherds to avenge their supposedly poisoned friends by killing Icarius. Maera, Icarius' dog, brought his daughter Erigone to her father's body, whereupon both she and the dog died by suicide. Zeus then chose to honor all three by placing them in the sky as constellations: Icarius as Boötes, Erigone as Virgo, and Maera as Canis Major or Canis Minor.

Following another reading, the constellation is identified with Arcas and also referred to as Arcas and Arcturus, son of Zeus and Callisto. Arcas was brought up by his maternal grandfather Lycaon, to whom one day Zeus went and had a meal. To verify that the guest was really the king of the gods, Lycaon killed his grandson and prepared a meal made from his flesh. Zeus noticed and became very angry, transforming Lycaon into a wolf and giving life back to his son. In the meantime Callisto had been transformed into a she-bear by Zeus's wife Hera, who was angry at Zeus's infidelity. This is corroborated by the Greek name for Boötes, Arctophylax, which means "Bear Watcher".

Callisto, in the form of a bear was almost killed by her son, who was out hunting. Zeus rescued her, taking her into the sky where she became Ursa Major, "the Great Bear". Arcturus, the name of the constellation's brightest star, comes from the Greek word meaning "guardian of the bear". Sometimes Arcturus is depicted as leading the hunting dogs of nearby Canes Venatici and driving the bears of Ursa Major and Ursa Minor.

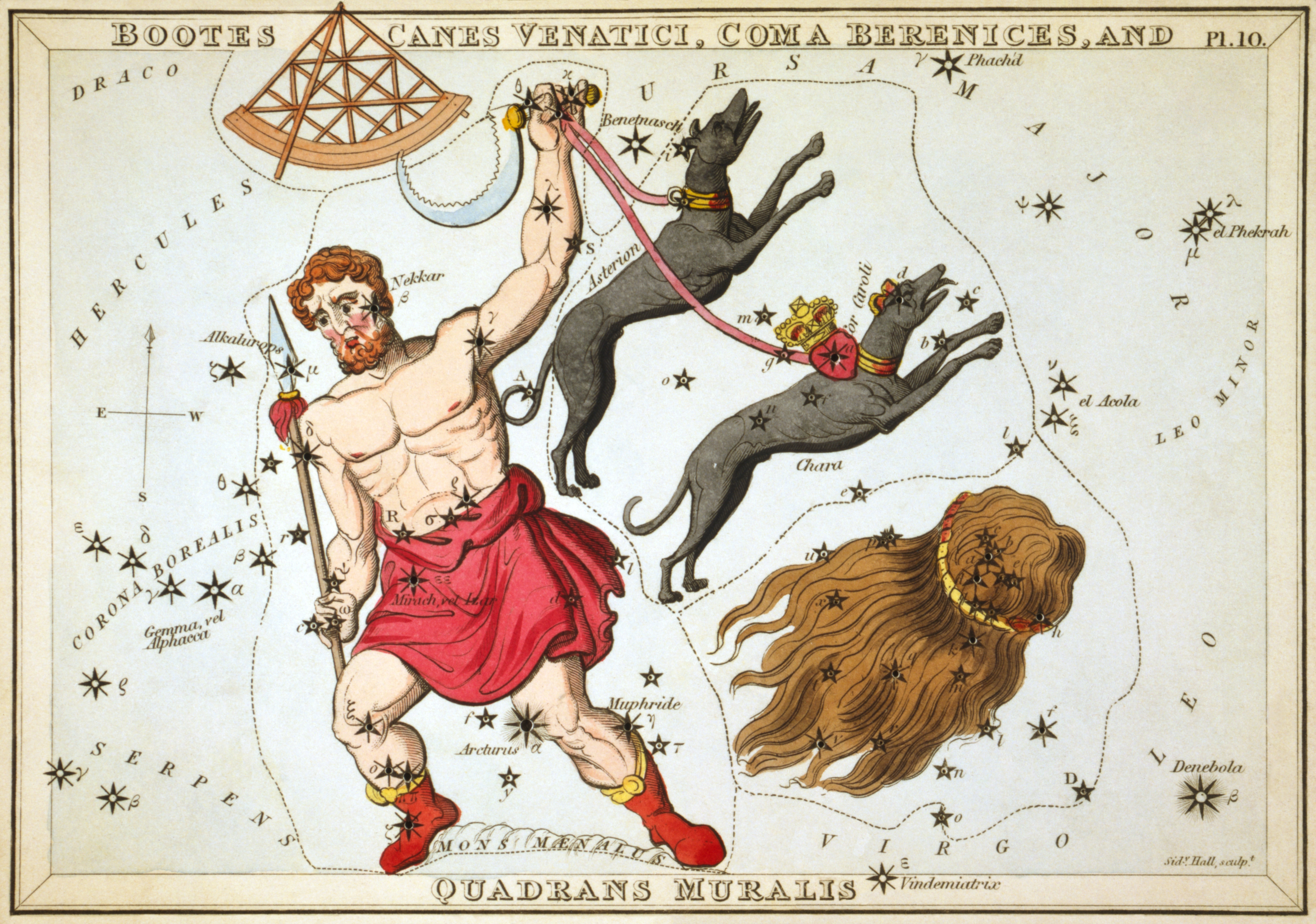
Boötes as depicted in Urania's Mirror, a set of constellation cards published in London c. 1825. In his left hand he holds his hunting dogs, Canes Venatici; below them is the constellation Coma Berenices. Above Boötes's head is the obsolete constellation Quadrans Muralis and at his feet is Mons Mænalus.

Several former constellations were formed from stars now included in Boötes. Quadrans Muralis, the Quadrant, was a constellation created near Beta Boötis from faint stars. It was designated in 1795 by Jérôme Lalande, an astronomer who used a quadrant to perform detailed astronometric measurements. Lalande worked with Nicole-Reine Lepaute and others to predict the 1758 return of Halley's Comet. Quadrans Muralis was formed from the stars of eastern Boötes, western Hercules and Draco. It was originally called Le Mural by Jean Fortin in his 1795 Atlas Céleste; it was not given the name Quadrans Muralis until Johann Bode's 1801 Uranographia. The constellation was quite faint, with its brightest stars reaching the 5th magnitude. Mons Maenalus, representing the Maenalus mountains, was created by Johannes Hevelius in 1687 at the foot of the constellation's figure. The mountain was named for the son of Lycaon, Maenalus. The mountain, one of Diana's hunting grounds, was also holy to Pan.

=== In non-Western astronomy ===
The stars of Boötes were incorporated into many different Chinese constellations. Arcturus was part of the most prominent of these, variously designated as the celestial king's throne (Tian Wang) or the Blue Dragon's horn (Daijiao); the name Daijiao, meaning "great horn", is more common. Arcturus was given such importance in Chinese celestial mythology because of its status marking the beginning of the lunar calendar, as well as its status as the brightest star in the northern night sky.

Two constellations flanked Daijiao: Yousheti to the right and Zuosheti to the left; they represented companions that orchestrated the seasons. Zuosheti was formed from modern Zeta, Omicron and Pi Boötis, while Yousheti was formed from modern Eta, Tau and Upsilon Boötis. Dixi, the Emperor's ceremonial banquet mat, was north of Arcturus, consisting of the stars 12, 11 and 9 Boötis. Another northern constellation was Qigong, the Seven Dukes, which mostly straddled the Boötes-Hercules border. It included either Delta Boötis or Beta Boötis as its terminus.

The other Chinese constellations made up of the stars of Boötes existed in the modern constellation's north; they are all representations of weapons. Tianqiang, the spear, was formed from Iota, Kappa and Theta Boötis; Genghe, variously representing a lance or shield, was formed from Epsilon, Rho and Sigma Boötis.

There were also two weapons made up of a singular star. Xuange, the halberd, was represented by Lambda Boötis, and Zhaoyao, either the sword or the spear, was represented by Gamma Boötis.

Two Chinese constellations have an uncertain placement in Boötes. Kangchi, the lake, was placed south of Arcturus, though its specific location is disputed. It may have been placed entirely in Boötes, on either side of the Boötes-Virgo border, or on either side of the Virgo-Libra border. The constellation Zhouding, a bronze tripod-mounted container used for food, was sometimes cited as the stars 1, 2 and 6 Boötis. However, it has also been associated with three stars in Coma Berenices.

Boötes is also known to Native American cultures. In Yup'ik language, Boötes is Taluyaq, literally "fish trap," and the funnel-shaped part of the fish trap is known as Ilulirat.

== Characteristics ==
Boötes is a constellation bordered by Virgo to the south, Coma Berenices and Canes Venatici to the west, Ursa Major to the northwest, Draco to the northeast, and Hercules, Corona Borealis and Serpens Caput to the east. The three-letter abbreviation for the constellation, as adopted by the International Astronomical Union in 1922, is "Boo". The official constellation boundaries, as set by Belgian astronomer Eugène Delporte in 1930, are defined by a polygon of 16 segments. In the equatorial coordinate system, the right ascension coordinates of these borders lie between 13^{h} 36.1^{m} and 15^{h} 49.3^{m} , while the declination coordinates stretch from +7.36° to +55.1°. Covering 907 square degrees, Boötes culminates at midnight around 2 May and ranks 13th in area.

Colloquially, its pattern of stars has been likened to a kite or ice cream cone. However, depictions of Boötes have varied historically. Aratus described him circling the north pole, herding the two bears. Later ancient Greek depictions, described by Ptolemy, have him holding the reins of his hunting dogs (Canes Venatici) in his left hand, with a spear, club, or staff in his right hand. After Hevelius introduced Mons Maenalus in 1681, Boötes was often depicted standing on the Peloponnese mountain. By 1801, when Johann Bode published his Uranographia, Boötes had acquired a sickle, which was also held in his left hand.

The placement of Arcturus has also been mutable through the centuries. Traditionally, Arcturus lay between his thighs, as Ptolemy depicted him. However, Germanicus Caesar deviated from this tradition by placing Arcturus "where his garment is fastened by a knot".

== Features ==
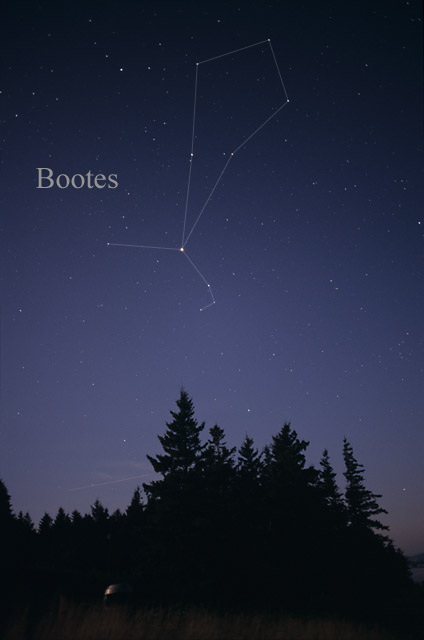
The constellation Boötes as it can be seen by the naked eye

=== Stars ===
In his Uranometria, Johann Bayer used the Greek letters alpha through to omega and then A to k to label what he saw as the most prominent 35 stars in the constellation, with subsequent astronomers splitting Kappa, Mu, Nu and Pi as two stars each. Nu is also the same star as Psi Herculis. John Flamsteed numbered 54 stars for the constellation.

Located 36.7 light-years from Earth, Arcturus, or Alpha Boötis, is the brightest star in Boötes and the fourth-brightest star in the sky at an apparent magnitude of −0.05; It is also the brightest star north of the celestial equator, just shading out Vega and Capella. Its name comes from the Greek for "bear-keeper". An orange giant of spectral class K1.5III, Arcturus is an ageing star that has exhausted its core supply of hydrogen and cooled and expanded to a diameter of 27 solar diameters, equivalent to approximately 32 million kilometers. Though its mass is approximately one solar mass (M_{☉}), Arcturus shines with 133 times the luminosity of the Sun (L_{☉}).

Bayer located Arcturus above the Herdman's left knee in his Uranometria. Nearby Eta Boötis, or Muphrid, is the uppermost star denoting the left leg. It is a 2.68-magnitude star 37 light-years distant with a spectral class of G0IV, indicating it has just exhausted its core hydrogen and is beginning to expand and cool. It is 9 times as luminous as the Sun and has 2.7 times its diameter. Analysis of its spectrum reveals that it is a spectroscopic binary. Muphrid and Arcturus lie only 3.3 light-years away from each other. Viewed from Arcturus, Muphrid would have a visual magnitude of −2½, while Arcturus would be around visual magnitude −4½ when seen from Muphrid.

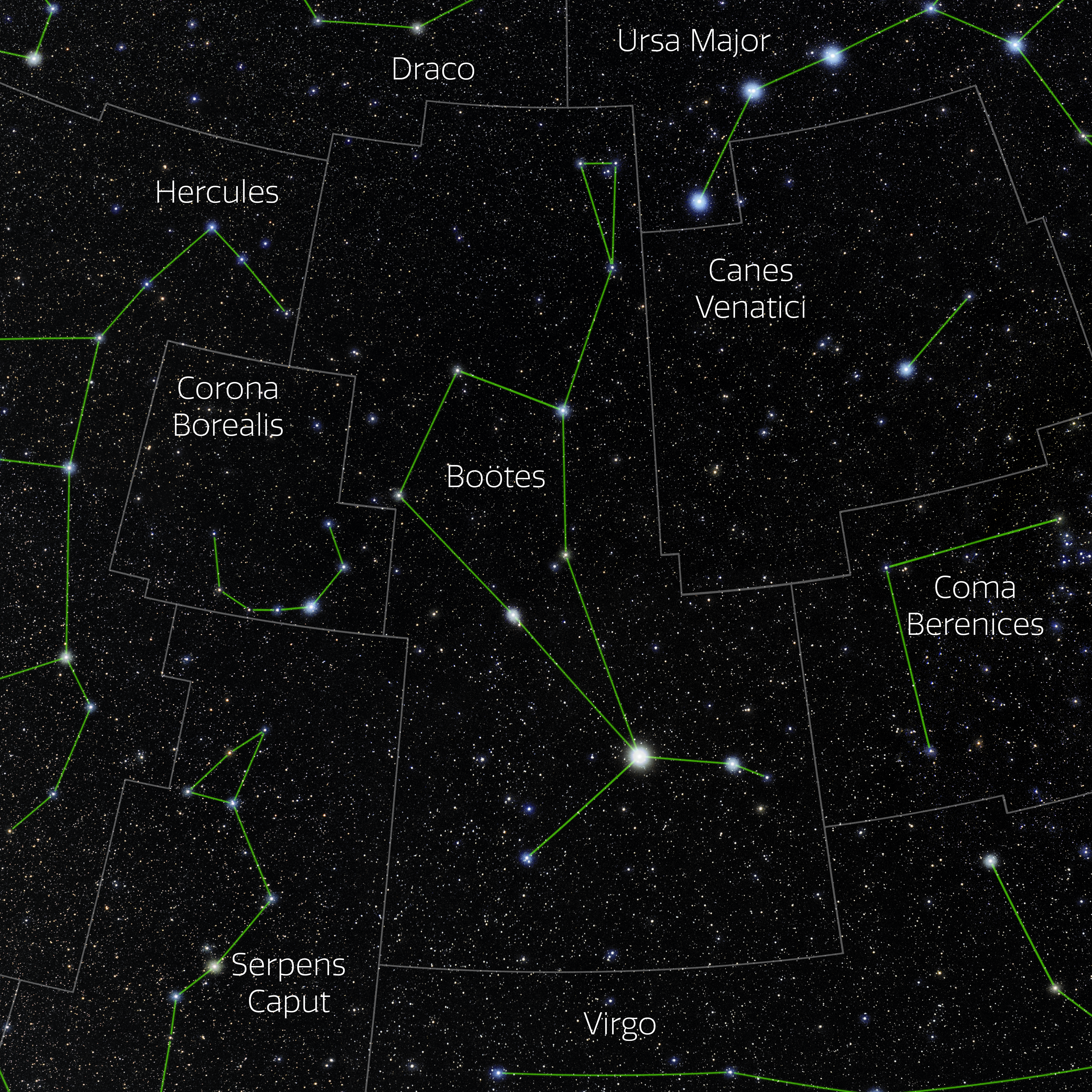
The constellation Boötes showing the IAU boundaries, the constellation stick figure, and labels for its brightest stars. Astrophotograph by Eckhard Slawik, from NOIRLab's 88 Constellations project.

Marking the herdsman's head is Beta Boötis, or Nekkar, a yellow giant of magnitude 3.5 and spectral type G8IIIa. Like Arcturus, it has expanded and cooled off the main sequence—likely to have lived most of its stellar life as a blue-white B-type main sequence star. Its common name comes from the Arabic phrase for "ox-driver". It is 219 light-years away and has a luminosity of 58 L_{☉}.

Located 86 light-years distant, Gamma Boötis, or Seginus, is a white giant star of spectral class A7III, with a luminosity 34 times and diameter 3.5 times that of the Sun. It is a Delta Scuti variable, ranging between magnitudes 3.02 and 3.07 every 7 hours. These stars are short period (six hours at most) pulsating stars that have been used as standard candles and as subjects to study asteroseismology.

Delta Boötis (Qigong) is a wide double star with a primary of magnitude 3.5 and a secondary of magnitude 7.8. The primary is a yellow giant that has cooled and expanded to 10.4 times the diameter of the Sun. Of spectral class G8IV, it is around 121 light-years away, while the secondary is a yellow main sequence star of spectral type G0V. The two are thought to take 120,000 years to orbit each other.

Mu Boötis, known as Alkalurops, is a triple star popular with amateur astronomers. It has an overall magnitude of 4.3 and is 121 light-years away. Its name is from the Arabic phrase for "club" or "staff". The primary appears to be of magnitude 4.3 and is blue-white. The secondary appears to be of magnitude 6.5, but is actually a close double star itself with a primary of magnitude 7.0 and a secondary of magnitude 7.6. The secondary and tertiary stars have an orbital period of 260 years. The primary has an absolute magnitude of 2.6 and is of spectral class F0. The secondary and tertiary stars are separated by 2 arcseconds; the primary and secondary are separated by 109.1 arcseconds at an angle of 171 degrees.

Nu Boötis is an optical double star. The primary is an orange giant of magnitude 5.0 and the secondary is a white star of magnitude 5.0. The primary is 870 light-years away and the secondary is 430 light-years.

Epsilon Boötis, also known as Izar (for component A) and Pulcherrima (for component B), is a close triple star popular with amateur astronomers and the most prominent binary star in Boötes. The primary is a yellow- or orange-hued magnitude 2.5 giant star, the secondary is a magnitude 4.6 blue-hued main-sequence star, and the tertiary is a magnitude 12.0 star. The system is 210 light-years away. The name "Izar" comes from the Arabic word for "girdle" or "loincloth", referring to its location in the constellation. The name "Pulcherrima" comes from the Latin phrase for "most beautiful", referring to its contrasting colors in a telescope. The primary and secondary stars are separated by 2.9 arcseconds at an angle of 341 degrees; the primary's spectral class is K0 and it has a luminosity of 200 L_{☉}. To the naked eye, Izar has a magnitude of 2.37.

Nearby Rho Boötis (Kalasungsang) and Sigma Boötis (Genghe) denote the herdsman's waist. Rho is an orange giant of spectral type K3III located around 160 light-years from Earth. It is ever so slightly variable, wavering by 0.003 of a magnitude from its average of 3.57. Sigma, a yellow-white main-sequence star of spectral type F3V, is suspected of varying in brightness from 4.45 to 4.49. It is around 52 light-years distant.

Traditionally known as Aulād al Dhiʼbah (أولاد الضباع – aulād al dhiʼb), "the Whelps of the Hyenas", Theta, Iota, Kappa and Lambda Boötis (or Xuange) are a small group of stars in the far north of the constellation. The magnitude 4.05 Theta Boötis has a spectral type of F7 and an absolute magnitude of 3.8. Iota Boötis is a triple star with a primary of magnitude 4.8 and spectral class of A7, a secondary of magnitude 7.5, and a tertiary of magnitude 12.6. The primary is 97 light-years away. The primary and secondary stars are separated by 38.5 arcseconds, at an angle of 33 degrees. The primary and tertiary stars are separated by 86.7 arcseconds at an angle of 194 degrees. Both the primary and tertiary appear white in a telescope, but the secondary appears yellow-hued.

Kappa Boötis is another wide double star. The primary is 155 light-years away and has a magnitude of 4.5. The secondary is 196 light-years away and has a magnitude of 6.6. The two components are separated by 13.4 arcseconds, at an angle of 236 degrees. The primary, with spectral class A7, appears white and the secondary appears bluish.

An apparent magnitude 4.18 type A0p star, Lambda Boötis is the prototype of a class of chemically peculiar stars, only some of which pulsate as Delta Scuti-type stars. The distinction between the Lambda Boötis stars as a class of stars with peculiar spectra, and the Delta Scuti stars whose class describes pulsation in low-overtone pressure modes, is an important one. While many Lambda Boötis stars pulsate and are Delta Scuti stars, not many Delta Scuti stars have Lambda Boötis peculiarities, since the Lambda Boötis stars are a much rarer class whose members can be found both inside and outside the Delta Scuti instability strip. Lambda Boötis stars are dwarf stars that can be either spectral class A or F. Like BL Boötis-type stars they are metal-poor. Scientists have had difficulty explaining the characteristics of Lambda Boötis stars, partly because only around 60 confirmed members exist, but also due to heterogeneity in the literature. Lambda has an absolute magnitude of 1.8.

There are two dimmer F-type stars, magnitude 4.83 12 Boötis, class F8; and magnitude 4.93 45 Boötis, class F5. Xi Boötis is a G8 yellow dwarf of magnitude 4.55, and absolute magnitude is 5.5. Two dimmer G-type stars are magnitude 4.86 31 Boötis, class G8, and magnitude 4.76 44 Boötis (proper name for component A is Quadrans since 17 February 2025), class G0.

Of apparent magnitude 4.06, Upsilon Boötis has a spectral class of K5 and an absolute magnitude of −0.3. Dimmer than Upsilon Boötis is magnitude 4.54 Phi Boötis, with a spectral class of K2 and an absolute magnitude of −0.1. Just slightly dimmer than Phi at magnitude 4.60 is O Boötis, which, like Izar, has a spectral class of K0. O Boötis has an absolute magnitude of 0.2. The other four dim stars are magnitude 4.91 6 Boötis, class K4; magnitude 4.86 20 Boötis, class K3; magnitude 4.81 Omega Boötis, class K4; and magnitude 4.83 A Boötis, class K1.

There is one bright B-class star in Boötes; magnitude 4.93 Pi^{1} Boötis. It has a spectral class of B9 and is 40 parsecs from Earth. There is also one M-type star, magnitude 4.81 34 Boötis (proper name is Alrumh since 15 April 2026). It is of class gM0.

==== Multiple stars ====
Besides Pulcherrima and Alkalurops, there are several other binary stars in Boötes:

- Xi Boötis is a quadruple star popular with amateur astronomers. The primary is a yellow star of magnitude 4.7 and the secondary is an orange star of magnitude 6.8. The system is 22 light-years away and has an orbital period of 150 years. The primary and secondary have a separation of 6.7 arcseconds at an angle of 319 degrees. The tertiary is a magnitude 12.6 star (though it may be observed to be brighter) and the quaternary is a magnitude 13.6 star.
- Pi Boötis is a close triple star. The primary is a blue-white star of magnitude 4.9, the secondary is a blue-white star of magnitude 5.8, and the tertiary is a star of magnitude 10.4. The primary and secondary components are separated by 5.6 arcseconds at an angle of 108 degrees; the primary and tertiary components are separated by 128 arcseconds at an angle of 128 degrees.
- Zeta Boötis is a triple star that consists of a physical binary pair with an optical companion. Lying 205 light-years away from Earth, The physical pair has a period of 123.3 years and consists of a magnitude 4.5 and a magnitude 4.6 star. The two components are separated by 1.0 arcseconds at an angle of 303 degrees. The optical companion is of magnitude 10.9, separated by 99.3 arcseconds at an angle of 259 degrees. 44 Boötis is an eclipsing variable star. The primary is of variable magnitude and the secondary is of magnitude 6.2; they have an orbital period of 225 years. The components are separated by 1.0 arcsecond at an angle of 40 degrees.
- 44 Boötis (Quadrans) is a double variable star 42 light-years away. It has an overall magnitude of 4.8 and appears yellow to the naked eye. The primary is of magnitude 5.3 and the secondary is of magnitude 6.1; their orbital period is 220 years. The secondary is itself an eclipsing variable star with a range of 0.6 magnitudes; its orbital period is 6.4 hours. It is a W Ursae Majoris variable that ranges in magnitude from a minimum of 7.1 to a maximum of 6.5 every 0.27 days. Both stars are G-type stars. Another eclipsing binary star is ZZ Boötis, which has two F2-type components of almost equal mass, and ranges in magnitude from a minimum of 6.79 to a maximum of 7.44 over a period of 5.0 days.

==== Variable stars ====
Two of the brighter Mira-type variable stars in the constellation are R and S Boötis. Both are red giants that range greatly in magnitude—from 6.2 to 13.1 over 223.4 days, and 7.8 to 13.8 over a period of 270.7 days, respectively. Also red giants, V and W Boötis are semi-regular variable stars that range in magnitude from 7.0 to 12.0 over a period of 258 days, and magnitude 4.7 to 5.4 over 450 days, respectively.

BL Boötis is the prototype of its class of pulsating variable stars, the anomalous Cepheids. These stars are somewhat similar to Cepheid variables, but they do not have the same relationship between their period and luminosity. Their periods are similar to RRAB variables; however, they are far brighter than these stars. BL Boötis is a member of the cluster NGC 5466. Anomalous Cepheids are metal poor and have masses not much larger than the Sun's, on average, 1.5 M_{☉}. BL Boötis type stars are a subtype of RR Lyrae variables.

T Boötis was a nova observed in April 1860 at a magnitude of 9.7. It has never been observed since, but that does not preclude the possibility of it being a highly irregular variable star or a recurrent nova.

==== Stars with planetary systems ====
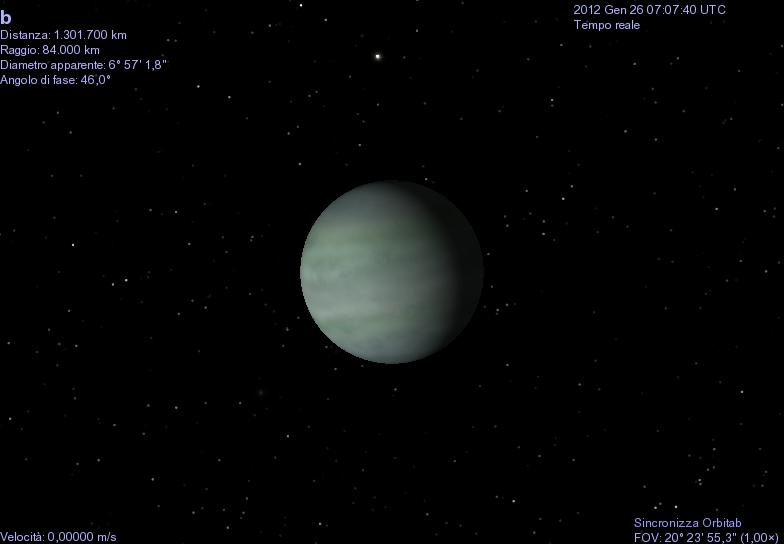
A digital rendering of Tau Boötis b

Extrasolar planets have been discovered encircling ten stars in Boötes as of 2012. Tau Boötis (Tepiamenit) is orbited by a large planet, discovered in 1999. The host star itself is a magnitude 4.5 star of type F7V, 15.6 parsecs from Earth. It has a mass of 1.3 M_{☉} and a radius of 1.331 solar radii (R_{☉}); a companion, GJ527B, orbits at a distance of 240 AU. Tau Boötis b, the sole planet discovered in the system, orbits at a distance of 0.046 AU every 3.31 days. Discovered through radial velocity measurements, it has a mass of 5.95 Jupiter masses (M_{J}). This makes it a hot Jupiter. The host star and planet are tidally locked, meaning that the planet's orbit and the star's particularly high rotation are synchronized. Furthermore, a slight variability in the host star's light may be caused by magnetic interactions with the planet. Carbon monoxide is present in the planet's atmosphere. Tau Boötis b does not transit its star; rather, its orbit is inclined 46 degrees.

Like Tau Boötis b, HAT-P-4b is also a hot Jupiter. It is noted for orbiting a particularly metal-rich host star and being of low density. Discovered in 2007, HAT-P-4 b has a mass of 0.68 M_{J} and a radius of 1.27 R_{J}. It orbits every 3.05 days at a distance of 0.04 AU. HAT-P-4, the host star, is an F-type star of magnitude 11.2, 310 parsecs from Earth. It is larger than the Sun, with a mass of 1.26 M_{☉} and a radius of 1.59 R_{☉}.

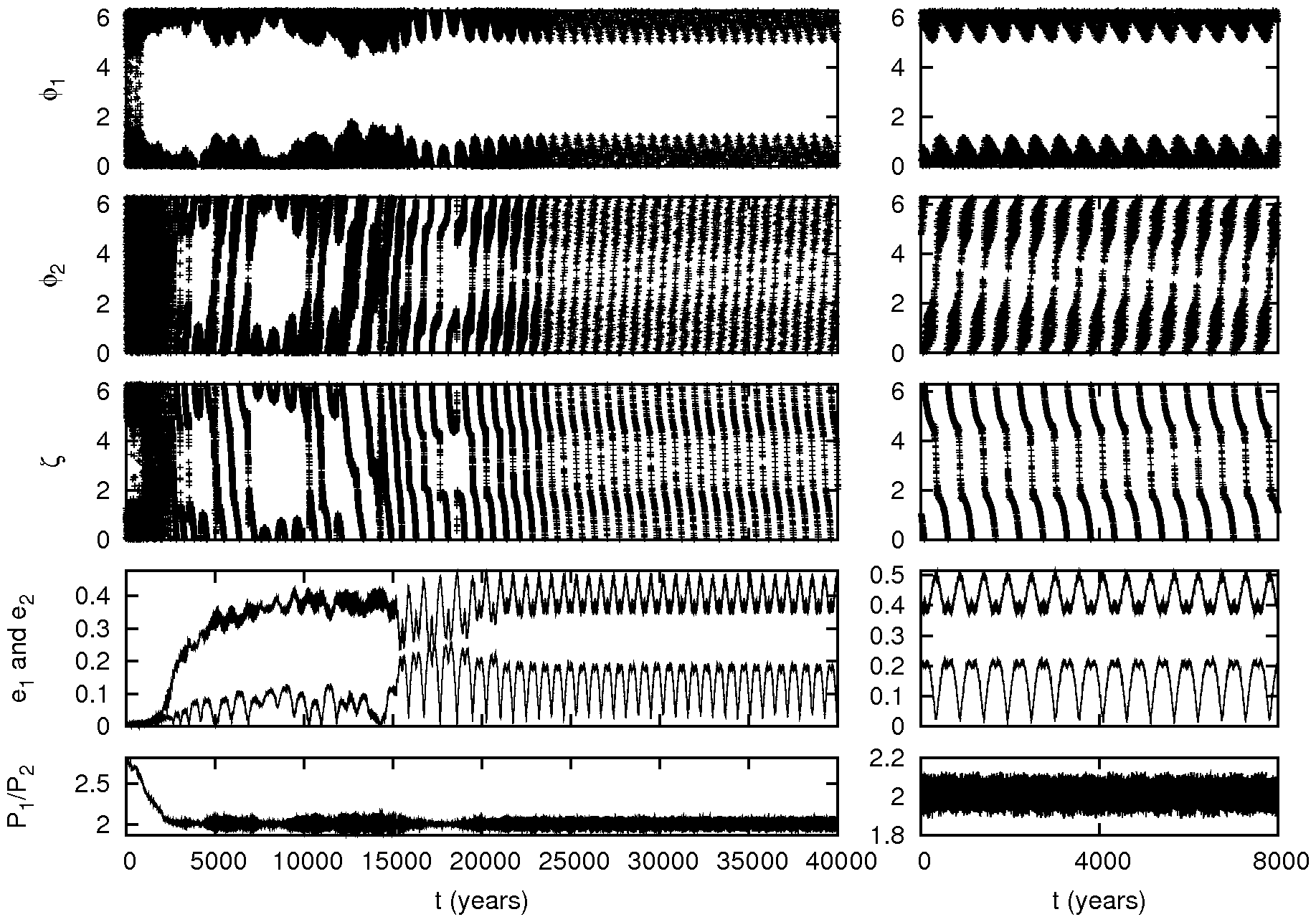
Evolution of the HD 128311 system over time

Boötes is also home to multiple-planet systems. HD 128311 is the host star for a two-planet system, consisting of HD 128311 b and HD 128311 c, discovered in 2002 and 2005, respectively. HD 128311 b is the smaller planet, with a mass of 2.18 M_{J}; it was discovered through radial velocity observations. It orbits at almost the same distance as Earth, at 1.099 AU; however, its orbital period is significantly longer at 448.6 days.

The larger of the two, HD 128311 c, has a mass of 3.21 M_{J} and was discovered in the same manner. It orbits every 919 days inclined at 50°, and is 1.76 AU from the host star. The host star, HD 128311, is a K0V-type star located 16.6 parsecs from Earth. It is smaller than the Sun, with a mass of 0.84 M_{☉} and a radius of 0.73 R_{☉}; it also appears below the threshold of naked-eye visibility at an apparent magnitude of 7.51.

There are several single-planet systems in Boötes. HD 132406 is a Sun-like star of spectral type G0V with an apparent magnitude of 8.45, 231.5 light-years from Earth. It has a mass of 1.09 M_{☉} and a radius of 1 R_{☉}. The star is orbited by a gas giant, HD 132406 b, discovered in 2007. HD 132406 orbits 1.98 AU from its host star with a period of 974 days and has a mass of 5.61 M_{J}. The planet was discovered by the radial velocity method.

HD 131496 (Arcalís) is also encircled by one planet, HD 131496 b (Madriu). The star is of type K0 and is located 110 parsecs from Earth; it appears at a visual magnitude of 7.96. It is significantly larger than the Sun, with a mass of 1.61 M_{☉} and a radius of 4.6 solar radii. Its one planet, discovered in 2011 by the radial velocity method, has a mass of 2.2 M_{J}; its radius is as yet undetermined. HD 131496 b orbits at a distance of 2.09 AU with a period of 883 days.

Another single planetary system in Boötes is the HD 132563 system, a triple star system. The parent star, technically HD 132563B, is a star of magnitude 9.47, 96 parsecs from Earth. It is almost exactly the size of the Sun, with the same radius and a mass only 1% greater. Its planet, HD 132563B b, was discovered in 2011 by the radial velocity method. 1.49 M_{J}, it orbits 2.62 AU from its star with a period of 1544 days. Its orbit is somewhat elliptical, with an eccentricity of 0.22. HD 132563B b is one of very few planets found in triple star systems; it orbits the isolated member of the system, which is separated from the other components, a spectroscopic binary, by 400 AU.

Also discovered through the radial velocity method, albeit a year earlier, is HD 136418 b, a two-Jupiter-mass planet that orbits the star HD 136418 at a distance of 1.32 AU with a period of 464.3 days. Its host star is a magnitude 7.88 G5-type star, 98.2 parsecs from Earth. It has a radius of 3.4 R_{☉} and a mass of 1.33 M_{☉}.

WASP-14 b is one of the most massive and dense exoplanets known, with a mass of 7.341 M_{J} and a radius of 1.281 R_{J}. Discovered via the transit method, it orbits 0.036 AU from its host star with a period of 2.24 days. WASP-14 b has a density of 4.6 grams per cubic centimeter, making it one of the densest exoplanets known. Its host star, WASP-14, is an F5V-type star of magnitude 9.75, 160 parsecs from Earth. It has a radius of 1.306 R_{☉} and a mass of 1.211 M_{☉}. It also has a very high proportion of lithium.

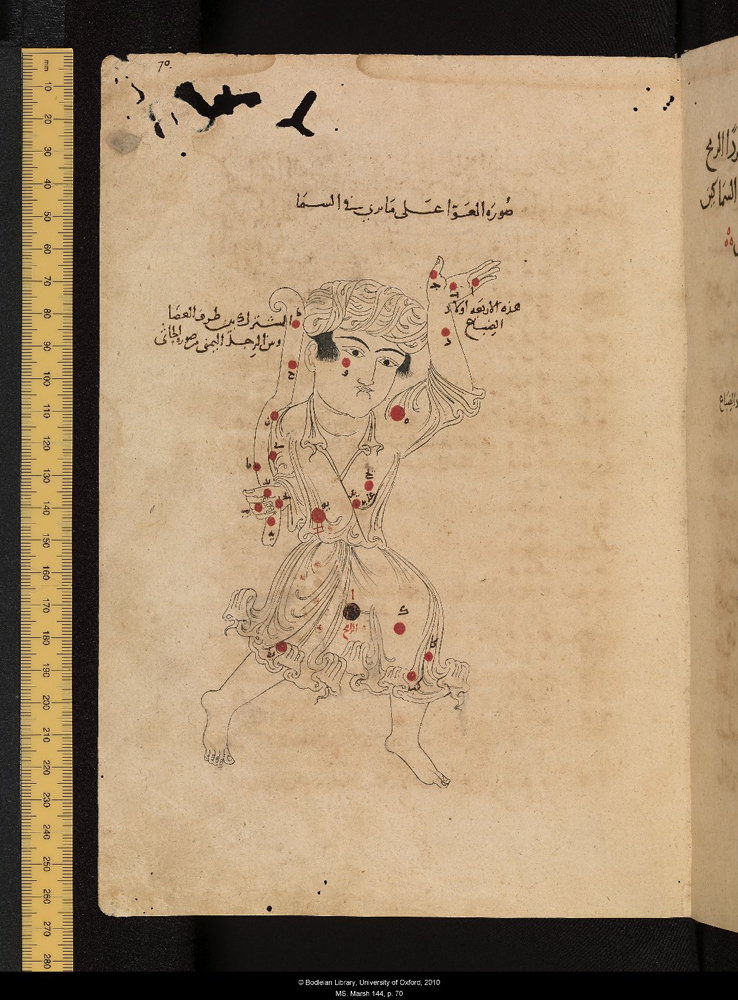
Boötes from Al-Sufi's Book of Fixed Stars, dated 1009–10

=== Named stars ===
Name	Bayer designation	Origin	Meaning	Light years
Arcturus	α	Ancient Greek	Guardian of the Bear	36.7
Nekkar	β	Arabic	the Herdsman	235
Seginus	γ	Latin	Unknown	86
Qigong	δ	Chinese	Seven Excellencies	120.5
Izar and Pulcherrima	ε	Arabic and Latin	Kilt like undergarment and Most Beautiful	236
Muphrid	η	Arabic	the (single) One of the Lancer	37
Xuange	λ	Chinese	Sombre Lance	100.1
Alkalurops	μ^{1}	Arab-Graeco	the Herdsman’s Crook	123
Kalasungsang	ρ	Sanskrit-Javanese	Upside down Demon	164
Genghe	σ	Chinese	Celestial Lance	51.4
Tepiamenit	τ	Egyptian	Predecessor of the Pole	51

=== Deep-sky objects ===
Hubble Space Telescope image of SDSSCGB 10189, three colliding galaxies

Boötes is in a part of the celestial sphere facing away from the plane of our home Milky Way galaxy, and so does not have open clusters or nebulae. Instead, it has one bright globular cluster and many faint galaxies. The globular cluster NGC 5466 has an overall magnitude of 9.1 and a diameter of 11 arcminutes. It is a very loose globular cluster with fairly few stars and may appear as a rich, concentrated open cluster in a telescope. NGC 5466 is classified as a Shapley–Sawyer Concentration Class 12 cluster, reflecting its sparsity. Its fairly large diameter means that it has a low surface brightness, so it appears far dimmer than the catalogued magnitude of 9.1 and requires a large amateur telescope to view. Only approximately 12 stars are resolved by an amateur instrument.

Boötes has two bright galaxies. NGC 5248 (Caldwell 45) is a type Sc galaxy (a variety of spiral galaxy) of magnitude 10.2. It measures 6.5 by 4.9 arcminutes. Fifty million light-years from Earth, NGC 5248 is a member of the Virgo Cluster of galaxies; it has dim outer arms and obvious H II regions, dust lanes and young star clusters. NGC 5676 is another type Sc galaxy of magnitude 10.9. It measures 3.9 by 2.0 arcminutes. Other galaxies include NGC 5008, a type Sc emission-line galaxy, NGC 5548, a type S Seyfert galaxy, NGC 5653, a type S HII galaxy, NGC 5778 (also classified as NGC 5825), a type E galaxy that is the brightest of its cluster, NGC 5886, and NGC 5888, a type SBb galaxy. NGC 5698 is a barred spiral galaxy, notable for being the host of the 2005 supernova SN 2005bc, which peaked at magnitude 15.3.

Further away lies the 250-million-light-year-diameter Boötes Void, a huge space largely empty of galaxies. Discovered by Robert Kirshner and colleagues in 1981, it is roughly 700 million light-years from Earth. Beyond it and within the bounds of the constellation, lie two superclusters at around 830 million and 1 billion light-years distant.

The Hercules–Corona Borealis Great Wall, the largest-known structure in the Universe, covers a significant part of Boötes.

=== Meteor showers ===
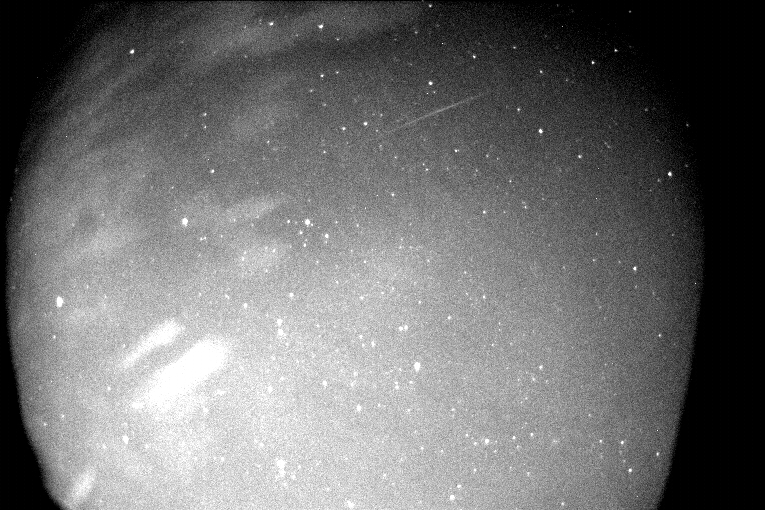
A Quadrantid captured by an all-sky camera during a 4-second exposure

Boötes is home to the Quadrantid meteor shower, the most prolific annual meteor shower. It was discovered in January 1835 and named in 1864 by Alexander Herschel. The radiant is located in northern Boötes near Kappa Boötis, in its namesake former constellation of Quadrans Muralis. Quadrantid meteors are dim, but have a peak visible hourly rate of approximately 100 per hour on January 3–4. The zenithal hourly rate of the Quadrantids is approximately 130 meteors per hour at their peak; it is also a very narrow shower.

The Quadrantids are notoriously difficult to observe because of a low radiant and often inclement weather. The parent body of the meteor shower has been disputed for decades; however, Peter Jenniskens has proposed 2003 EH_{1}, a minor planet, as the parent. 2003 EH_{1} may be linked to C/1490 Y_{1}, a comet previously thought to be a potential parent body for the Quadrantids.

2003 EH_{1} is a short-period comet of the Jupiter family; 500 years ago, it experienced a catastrophic breakup event. It is now dormant. The Quadrantids had notable displays in 1982, 1985 and 2004. Meteors from this shower often appear to have a blue hue and travel at a moderate speed of 41.5–43 kilometers per second.

On April 28, 1984, a remarkable outburst of the normally placid Alpha Bootids was observed by visual observer Frank Witte from 00:00 to 2:30 UTC. In a 6 cm telescope, he observed 433 meteors in a field of view near Arcturus with a diameter of less than 1°. Peter Jenniskens comments that this outburst resembled a "typical dust trail crossing". The Alpha Bootids normally begin on April 14, peaking on April 27 and 28, and finishing on May 12. Its meteors are slow-moving, with a velocity of 20.9 kilometers per second. They may be related to Comet 73P/Schwassmann–Wachmann 3, but this connection is only theorized.

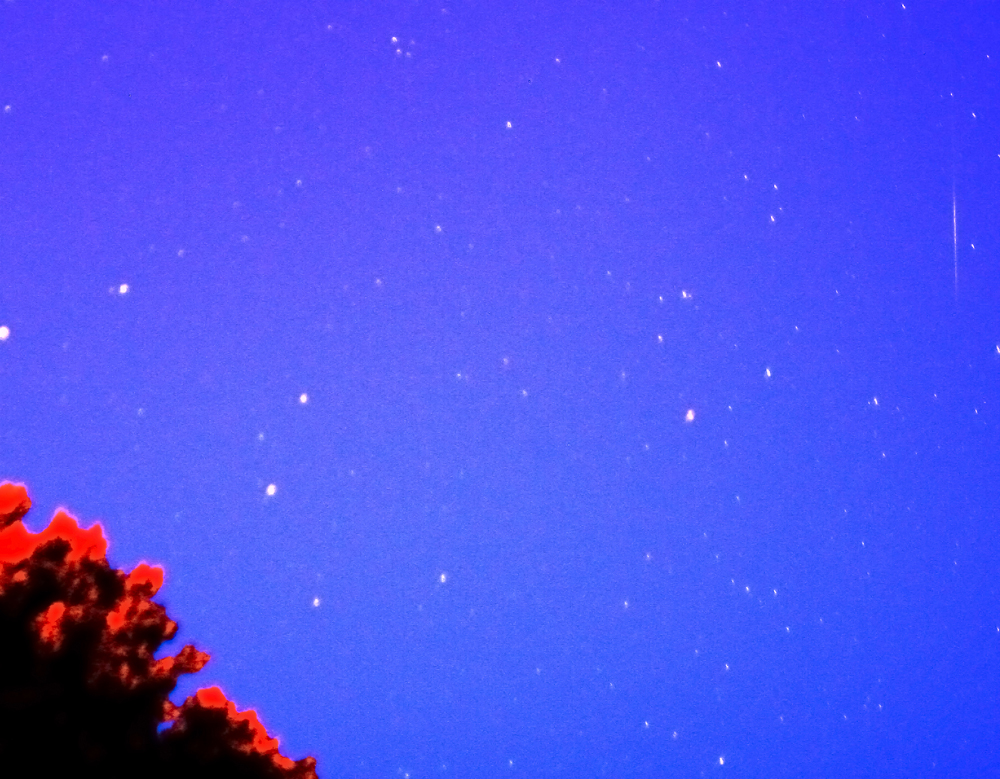
A bright Quadrantid observed at twilight

The June Bootids, also known as the Iota Draconids, is a meteor shower associated with the comet 7P/Pons–Winnecke, first recognized on May 27, 1916, by William F. Denning. The shower, with its slow meteors, was not observed prior to 1916 because Earth did not cross the comet's dust trail until Jupiter perturbed Pons–Winnecke's orbit, causing it to come within 0.03 AU (4.5 million km; 2.8 million mi) of Earth's orbit the first year the June Bootids were observed.

In 1982, E. A. Reznikov discovered that the 1916 outburst was caused by material released from the comet in 1819. Another outburst of the June Bootids was not observed until 1998, because Comet Pons–Winnecke's orbit was not in a favorable position. However, on June 27, 1998, an outburst of meteors radiating from Boötes, later confirmed to be associated with Pons-Winnecke, was observed. They were incredibly long-lived, with trails of the brightest meteors lasting several seconds at times. Many fireballs, green-hued trails, and even some meteors that cast shadows were observed throughout the outburst, which had a maximum zenithal hourly rate of 200–300 meteors per hour.

Two Russian astronomers determined in 2002 that material ejected from the comet in 1825 was responsible for the 1998 outburst. Ejecta from the comet dating to 1819, 1825 and 1830 was predicted to enter Earth's atmosphere on June 23, 2004. The predictions of a shower less spectacular than the 1998 showing were borne out in a display that had a maximum zenithal hourly rate of 16–20 meteors per hour that night. The June Bootids are not expected to have another outburst in the next 50 years.

Typically, only one to two dim, very slow meteors are visible per hour; the average June Bootid has a magnitude of 5.0. It is related to the Alpha Draconids and the Bootids-Draconids. The shower lasts from June 27 to July 5, with a peak on the night of June 28. The June Bootids are classified as a class III shower (variable), and has an average entry velocity of 18 kilometers per second. Its radiant is located 7 degrees north of Beta Boötis.

The Beta Bootids is a weak shower that begins on January 5, peaks on January 16, and ends on January 18. Its meteors travel at 43 km/s. The January Bootids is a short, young meteor shower that begins on January 9, peaks from January 16 to January 18, and ends on January 18.

The Phi Bootids is another weak shower radiating from Boötes. It begins on April 16, peaks on April 30 and May 1, and ends on May 12. Its meteors are slow-moving, with a velocity of 15.1 km/s. They were discovered in 2006. The shower's peak hourly rate can be as high as six meteors per hour. Though named for a star in Boötes, the Phi Bootid radiant has moved into Hercules. The meteor stream is associated with three different asteroids: 1620 Geographos, 2062 Aten and 1978 CA.

The Lambda Bootids, part of the Bootid-Coronae Borealid Complex, are a weak annual shower with moderately fast meteors; 41.75 km/s. The complex includes the Lambda Bootids, as well as the Theta Coronae Borealids and Xi Coronae Borealids. All of the Bootid-Coronae Borealid showers are Jupiter family comet showers; the streams in the complex have highly inclined orbits.

There are several minor showers in Boötes, some of whose existence is yet to be verified. The Rho Bootids radiate from near the namesake star, and were hypothesized in 2010. The average Rho Bootid has an entry velocity of 43 km/s. It peaks in November and lasts for three days.

The Rho Bootid shower is part of the SMA complex, a group of meteor showers related to the Taurids, which is in turn linked to the comet 2P/Encke. However, the link to the Taurid shower remains unconfirmed and may be a chance correlation. Another such shower is the Gamma Bootids, which were hypothesized in 2006. Gamma Bootids have an entry velocity of 50.3 km/s. The Nu Bootids, hypothesized in 2012, have faster meteors, with an entry velocity of 62.8 km/s.

== See also ==
- Lists of astronomical objects
