= NGC 5676 =

Galaxy in the constellation Boötes

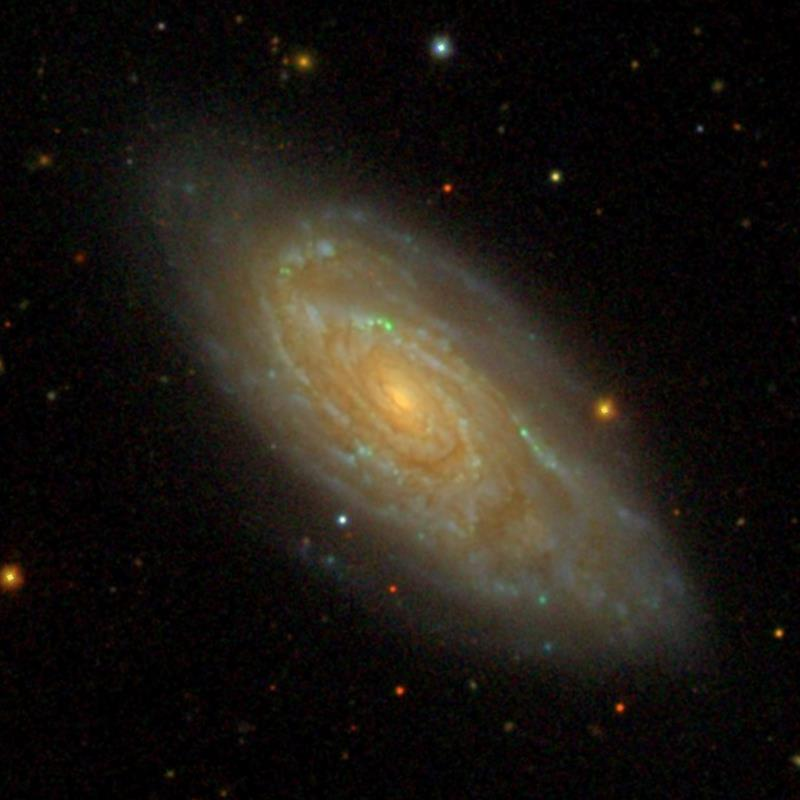
- SDSS image of NGC 5676

Observation data (J2000 epoch)
- Constellation: Boötes
- Right ascension: 14^{h} 32^{m} 46.8^{s}
- Declination: +49° 27′ 28″
- Redshift: 2114 ± 5 km/s
- Distance: 100 Mly (30.8 Mpc)
- Apparent magnitude (V): 12.3

Characteristics
- Type: SA(rs)bc
- Apparent size (V): 4.0′ × 1.1′
- Notable features: Paired with NGC 5660.

Other designations
- UGC 9366, PGC 51978, MCG+08-26-043, H I-189, h 1842, GC 3935, CGCG 247.042, CGCG 248.003, KUG 1431+496, LGG 384-005

NGC 5676 is an unbarred spiral galaxy in the constellation Boötes.

== Disk ==
This spiral galaxy is notably asymmetric. The spiral arms on the south side of the galaxy are chaotic in appearance, whereas the spiral arms on the north side of the galaxy are very well-defined. Also, the spiral arms on the south side of the disk extend twice as far from the galaxy's nucleus as the spiral arms on the north side. Because of the fragmentary appearance of some of the spiral arms, this galaxy is classified as a flocculent galaxy.

== Star formation ==
The north part of the disk also contains what appears to be a very intense region of star formation. Unusually, the star formation within this region appears to be more intense than the star formation in the galaxy's nucleus, and it is the brightest infrared source within the disk.
