= 6 Boötis =

Star in the constellation Boötes

- Location of 6 Boötis (circled in red)

Observation data Epoch J2000.0 Equinox ICRS
- Constellation: Boötes
- Right ascension: 13^{h} 49^{m} 42.82223^{s}
- Declination: +21° 15′ 50.8580″
- Apparent magnitude (V): 4.92

Characteristics
- Spectral type: K4 III + M8 V
- B−V color index: 1.432±0.013

Astrometry
Radial velocity (R_{v})	−3.71±0.48 km/s
Proper motion (μ)	RA: +33.773 mas/yr Dec.: +10.842 mas/yr
Parallax (π)	7.1527±0.3659 mas
Distance	460 ± 20 ly (140 ± 7 pc)
Absolute magnitude (M_{V})	−0.49

Orbit
Period (P)	944±8 d
Eccentricity (e)	0.41±0.09
Periastron epoch (T)	2,444,739.5±31.0 JD
Argument of periastron (ω) (secondary)	359±15°
Semi-amplitude (K_{1}) (primary)	1.19±0.15 km/s

Details
Mass	5.0 M_{☉}
Radius	36 R_{☉}
Luminosity	382 L_{☉}
Surface gravity (log g)	1.49 cgs
Temperature	4,185 K
Metallicity [Fe/H]	−0.24 dex
Rotational velocity (v sin i)	2.0 km/s
Age	1.9 Gyr

Other designations
- e Boötis, 6 Boo, BD+21°2578, FK5 3098, GC 18683, HD 120539, HIP 67480, HR 5201, SAO 83015

Database references
SIMBAD	data

6 Boötis is a binary star system in the northern constellation of Boötes, located around 460 light years away from the Sun. It has the Bayer designation e Boötis; 6 Boötis is the Flamsteed designation. The system is visible to the naked eye as a faint, orange-hued star with an apparent visual magnitude of 4.92. It is moving closer to the Earth with a heliocentric radial velocity of −3 km/s.

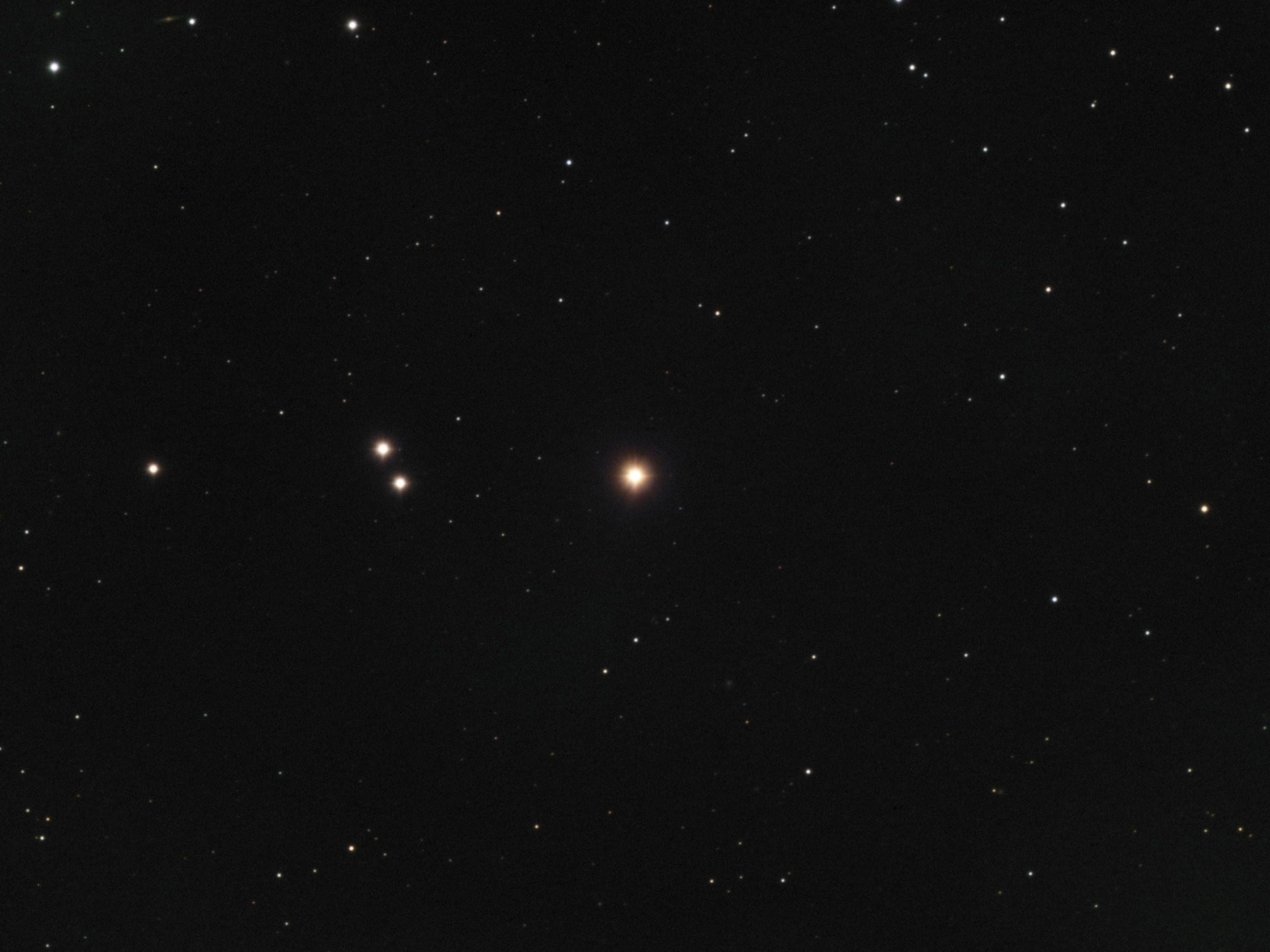
6 Boötis in optical light.

This is a single-lined spectroscopic binary system with an orbital period of 2.58 years and an eccentricity of 0.4. The visible component is an evolved giant star with a stellar classification of K4 III. Its measured angular diameter is 2.53±0.12 mas. At the estimated distance of the star, this yields a physical size of about 36 times the radius of the Sun. The star is radiating 382 times the luminosity of the Sun from its enlarged photosphere at an effective temperature of 4,185 K. Its companion is probably a low mass red dwarf of around class M8 V.
