= Eta Boötis =

Binary star system in the constellation Boötes

η Boötis
- Location of η Boötis (circled)

Observation data Epoch J2000 Equinox ICRS
- Constellation: Boötes
- Right ascension: 13^{h} 54^{m} 41.07892^{s}
- Declination: +18° 23′ 51.7946″
- Apparent magnitude (V): 2.680

Characteristics
- Evolutionary stage: subgiant
- Spectral type: G0 IV
- U−B color index: +0.207
- B−V color index: +0.585

Astrometry
| Radial velocity (R_{v}) | −5.254±0.009 km/s |
| Proper motion (μ) | RA: −60.95 mas/yr Dec.: −356.29 mas/yr |
| Parallax (π) | 87.75±1.24 mas |
| Distance | 37.2 ± 0.5 ly (11.4 ± 0.2 pc) |
| Absolute magnitude (M_{V}) | 2.41 |

Details
| Mass | 1.71±0.05 M_{☉} |
| Radius | 2.72±0.05 R_{☉} |
| Luminosity | 8.758±0.261 L_{☉} |
| Surface gravity (log g) | 3.794±0.034 cgs |
| Temperature | 6,161±18 K |
| Metallicity [Fe/H] | +0.25±0.01 dex |
| Rotational velocity (v sin i) | 11.8 km/s |
| Age | 2.7 Gyr |

Other designations
- Muphrid, Saak, 8 Boötis, BD+19°2725, FK5 513, GC 18805, GJ 534, HD 121370, HIP 67927, HR 5235, SAO 100766, PPM 130166, WDS J13547+1824, LTT 14060

Database references
| SIMBAD | data |

Eta Boötis is a candidate binary star system in the constellation of Boötes. Its name is a Bayer designation that is Latinized from η Boötis, and abbreviated Eta Boo or η Boo. This system is visible to the naked eye as a point of light with an apparent visual magnitude of 2.68. Based on parallax measurements obtained during the Hipparcos mission, it is approximately 37 light-years (11 pc) distant from the Sun. It is drifting closer with a radial velocity of −5.3 km/s.

Since 1943, the spectrum of this star has served as one of the stable anchor points by which other stars are classified. It forms a double star with the star BD+19 2726, two arc-minutes away It is also a suspected spectroscopic binary. As a constituent of a double pair, Eta Boötis is designated WDS J13547+1824A, with its two spectroscopic components being designated Aa (formally named Muphrid /ˈmjuːfrɪd/, the traditional name for the entire system) and Ab. BD +19 2726 is designated WDS J13547+1824B, but it is an unrelated object much further away than Eta Boötis.

== Nomenclature ==
η Boötis (Latinised to Eta Boötis) is the binary pair's Bayer designation; η Boötis A and B those of its two components. The designations of the two constituents of the double pair as WDS J13547+1824A and B and those of A's components - Aa and Ab - derive from the convention used by the Washington Multiplicity Catalog (WMC) for multiple star systems, and adopted by the International Astronomical Union (IAU).

Eta Boötis bore the traditional names Muphrid and Saak. Muphrid is from the Arabic مفرد الرامح mufrid ar-rāmiħ "the (single) one of the lancer". In 2016, the IAU organized a Working Group on Star Names (WGSN) to catalogue and standardize proper names for stars. The WGSN decided to attribute proper names to individual stars rather than entire multiple systems. It approved the name Muphrid for the component Eta Boötis Aa on 12 September 2016 and it is now so included in the List of IAU-approved Star Names.

In the catalogue of stars in the Calendarium of Al Achsasi al Mouakket, this star was designated Ramih al Ramih (رمح الرامح rumḥ al rāmiḥ), which was translated into Latin as Lancea Lanceator, possibly meaning the lance of the lancer.

In Chinese, 右攝提 (Yòu Niè Dī), meaning "the Right Conductor", refers to an asterism consisting of Eta Boötis, Tau Boötis and Upsilon Boötis. Consequently, the Chinese name for Eta Boötis itself is 右攝提一 (Yòu Niè Dī yī, English: "the First Star of the Right Conductor").

In the indigenous Australian Boorong (Wergaia) culture, this star is named Weetkurrk, the singing bush lark.

== Properties ==
Eta Boötis is a suspected spectroscopic binary with a reported period of 494 days, but the companion was not confirmed through speckle interferometry. This measurement does not rule out a low mass stellar companion of spectral class M7.

Eta Boötis presents as a subgiant that has begun the process of evolving from a main sequence star into a red giant. It has about 1.7 times the mass of the Sun and 2.66 times the Sun's radius. The estimated age of this star is about 2.7 billion years. Based on its spectra, it has a significant excess of elements heavier than helium. In fact the ratio of iron to hydrogen is considered close to the upper limit for dwarf stars in the galactic disk.

Eta Boötis appears close to the prominent star Arcturus (Alpha Bootis) in Earth's sky, and Arcturus is in fact its closest stellar neighbor, as both stars are nearly identical in distance from the Sun. The two stars are about 3.24 light-years apart, and each would appear bright in the other's sky. Arcturus would appear as roughly magnitude -5.2 (about 120 times brighter than it appears from Earth, or close to twice the brightness of Venus) in the night sky of a hypothetical planet orbiting Eta Boötis, while Eta Boötis would appear at about magnitude −2.4 (absolute magnitude −2.41 at 0.99 parsec) in the sky of a hypothetical planet orbiting Arcturus, or over twice the brightness of Sirius in the night sky.

== See also ==
- List of star systems within 35–40 light-years
