= Phi Boötis =

Star in the constellation of Boötes

- Location of φ Boötis (circled in red)

Observation data Epoch J2000.0 Equinox J2000.0 (ICRS)
- Constellation: Boötes
- Right ascension: 15^{h} 37^{m} 49.598^{s}
- Declination: +40° 21′ 12.36″
- Apparent magnitude (V): +5.24

Characteristics
- Evolutionary stage: red clump
- Spectral type: G7 III-IV Fe-2
- U−B color index: +0.53
- B−V color index: +0.88

Astrometry
Radial velocity (R_{v})	−10.62±0.30 km/s
Proper motion (μ)	RA: +61.380 mas/yr Dec.: +59.791 mas/yr
Parallax (π)	18.5752±0.0555 mas
Distance	175.6 ± 0.5 ly (53.8 ± 0.2 pc)
Absolute magnitude (M_{V})	+1.67

Details
Mass	1.43 M_{☉}
Radius	5 R_{☉}
Luminosity	17 L_{☉}
Surface gravity (log g)	2.82±0.14 cgs
Temperature	4,945±57 K
Metallicity [Fe/H]	−0.51±0.06 dex
Rotational velocity (v sin i)	0.0 km/s
Age	3.16 Gyr

Other designations
- φ Boo, 54 Boötis, BD+40°2907, FK5 580, GC 21032, HD 139641, HIP 76534, HR 5823, SAO 45643

Database references
SIMBAD	data

Phi Boötis is a single, yellow-hued star in the northern constellation of Boötes. Its name is a Bayer designation that is Latinized from φ Boötis, and abbreviated Phi Boo or φ Boo. This star is dimly visible to the naked eye with an apparent visual magnitude of +5.24. Based upon an annual parallax shift of 18.58 mas as seen from the Earth, it is located 176 light-years (54 pc) from the Sun. At that distance, the visual magnitude is diminished by an extinction of 0.09 due to interstellar dust. It is moving closer to the Sun with a radial velocity of −10.6 km/s.

The stellar classification of Phi Boötis is G7 III-IV Fe-2, which would suggest it is an evolving G-type star that shows spectral traits of both a subgiant and a giant star. However, Alves (2000) has it listed as a member of the so-called "red clump", indicating that it is an aging giant star that is generating energy through helium fusion at its core. The 'Fe-2' suffix notation in its class means that it displays a significant underabundance of iron in its spectrum. Around three billion years old, Phi Boötis has an estimated 1.43 times the mass of the Sun and 5 times the Sun's radius. It is radiating 17 times the Sun's luminosity from its enlarged photosphere at an effective temperature of about 4,945 K.
