= NGC 5888 =

Galaxy in the constellation Boötes

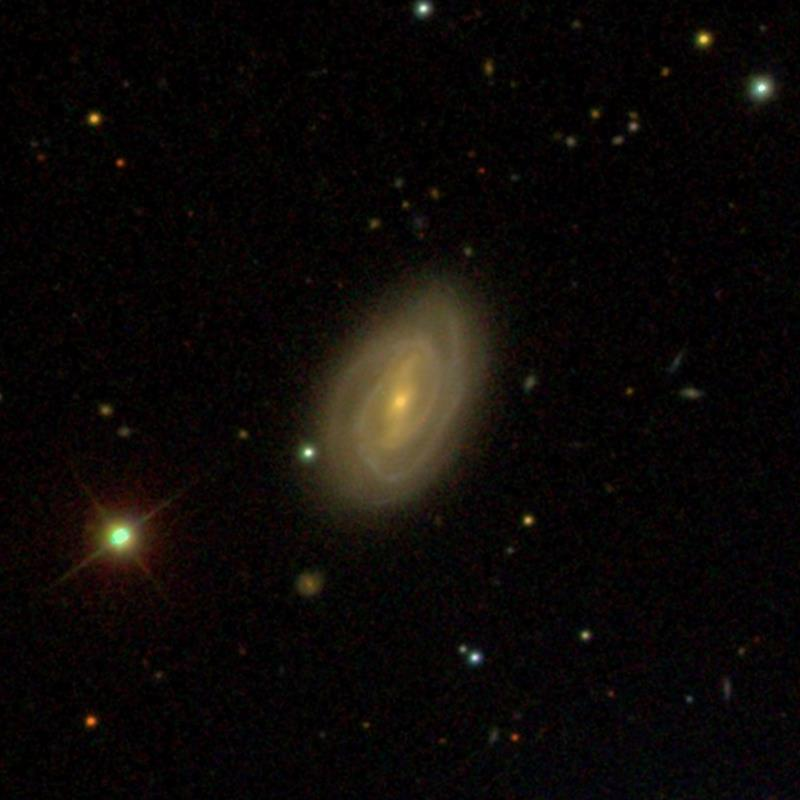
- NGC 5888 imaged by SDSS

Observation data (J2000 epoch)
- Constellation: Boötes
- Right ascension: 15^{h} 13^{m} 07.3590^{s}
- Declination: +41° 15′ 52.900″
- Redshift: 0.029050±0.000011
- Heliocentric radial velocity: 8,709±3 km/s
- Distance: 424.1 ± 29.7 Mly (130.04 ± 9.10 Mpc)
- Apparent magnitude (V): 13.8g

Characteristics
- Type: SB(s)bc
- Size: ~234,900 ly (72.03 kpc) (estimated)
- Apparent size (V): 1.36′ × 0.82′

Other designations
- IRAS F15112+4127, UGC 9771, MCG +07-31-038, PGC 54316, CGCG 221-037

NGC 5888 is a barred spiral galaxy in the constellation of Boötes. Its velocity with respect to the cosmic microwave background is 8,817±8 km/s, which corresponds to a Hubble distance of 424.1 ± 29.7 Mly (130.04 ± 9.10 Mpc). It was discovered by German-British astronomer William Herschel on 9 April 1787.

NGC 5888 is a LINER galaxy, i.e. a galaxy whose nucleus has an emission spectrum characterized by broad lines of weakly ionized atoms. It also has an active galaxy nucleus, i.e. it has a compact region at the center of a galaxy that emits a significant amount of energy across the electromagnetic spectrum, with characteristics indicating that this luminosity is not produced by the stars.

NGC 5888, together with NGC 5886, form a gravitationally bound pair of galaxies.

== Supernovae ==
Three supernovae have been observed in NGC 5888:

- SN 2007Q (Type II, mag. 17.8) was discovered by Tim Puckett and Jack Newton on 3 January 2007.
- SN 2010fv (Type II, mag. 20.1) was discovered by Lick Observatory Supernova Search (LOSS) on 1 July 2010.
- SN 2018lev (Type II, mag. 18.77) was discovered by Gaia Photometric Science Alerts on 29 December 2018.

== See also ==
- List of NGC objects (5001–6000)
