= 1 Boötis =

Binary star in the constellation Boötes

Observation data Epoch J2000 Equinox J2000
Constellation	Boötes
- A
Right ascension	13^{h} 40^{m} 40.46926^{s}
Declination	+19° 57′ 20.5839″
- Apparent magnitude (V): 5.78
- A
Right ascension	13^{h} 40^{m} 40.46926^{s}
Declination	+19° 57′ 20.5839″
- Apparent magnitude (V): 9.60

Characteristics
- Spectral type: A1 V + Am
- U−B color index: +0.02
- B−V color index: +0.02

Astrometry

A
Radial velocity (R_{v})	−26 km/s
Proper motion (μ)	RA: −46.723 mas/yr Dec.: +23.172 mas/yr
Parallax (π)	10.3308±0.0533 mas
Distance	316 ± 2 ly (96.8 ± 0.5 pc)
Absolute magnitude (M_{V})	+0.79

B
Proper motion (μ)	RA: −44,301 mas/yr Dec.: +28.326 mas/yr
Parallax (π)	10.4702 ± 0.0232 mas
Distance	311.5 ± 0.7 ly (95.5 ± 0.2 pc)

Details

1 Boö A
Mass	2.54±0.09 M_{☉}
Radius	2.5 R_{☉}
Luminosity	56 L_{☉}
Surface gravity (log g)	3.90 cgs
Temperature	9,863 K
Rotational velocity (v sin i)	60 km/s
Age	323 Myr

1 Boö B
Mass	1.02 M_{☉}
Radius	1.1 R_{☉}
Luminosity	0.76 L_{☉}
Surface gravity (log g)	4.28 cgs
Temperature	5,370 K

Other designations
- BD+20°2858, HD 119055, HIP 66727, HR 5144, SAO 82942, CCDM J13407+1958, WDS J13407+1957

Database references
SIMBAD	data
- B

1 Boötis (1 Boo) is a binary star system in the northern constellation of Boötes, located 318 light years away from the Sun. It is visible to the naked eye as a dim, white-hued star with a combined apparent visual magnitude of 5.71. The pair had an angular separation of 4.660″ as of 2008. It is moving closer to the Earth with a heliocentric radial velocity of −26 km/s.

The magnitude 5.78 primary component is an A-type main-sequence star with a stellar classification of A1 V. This star has 2.5 times the mass of the Sun and is radiating 56 times the Sun's luminosity from its photosphere at an effective temperature of 9,863 K. It is 323 million years old and is spinning with a projected rotational velocity of 60 km/s.

The system is a source for X-ray emission, which is most likely coming from the companion star. This magnitude 9.60 component is a possible pre-main sequence star with a mass similar to the Sun. It is radiating 76% of the Sun's luminosity at an effective temperature of 6,370 K.
