= 45 Boötis =

Single star in the constellation Boötes

- Location of 45 Boötis (circled in red)

Observation data Epoch J2000 Equinox ICRS
- Constellation: Boötes
- Right ascension: 15^{h} 07^{m} 18.06587^{s}
- Declination: +24° 52′ 09.0952″
- Apparent magnitude (V): 4.93

Characteristics
- Spectral type: F5 V
- B−V color index: +0.43

Astrometry
Radial velocity (R_{v})	−11.2 km/s
Proper motion (μ)	RA: +184.767 mas/yr Dec.: −164.012 mas/yr
Parallax (π)	51.6674±0.1882 mas
Distance	63.1 ± 0.2 ly (19.35 ± 0.07 pc)
Absolute magnitude (M_{V})	3.96

Details
Mass	1.21±0.16 M_{☉}
Radius	1.461±0.027 R_{☉}
Luminosity	3.30+0.25 −0.22 L_{☉}
Surface gravity (log g)	4.19 cgs
Temperature	6,435 K
Metallicity [Fe/H]	−0.02 dex
Rotational velocity (v sin i)	39.8 km/s
Age	1.6+0.8 −0.6 Gyr

Other designations
- c Boo, 45 Boo, NSV 6945, BD+25°2873, FK5 1396, GJ 578, HD 134083, HIP 73996, HR 5634, SAO 83671, WDS J15073+2452

Database references
SIMBAD	data

45 Boötis is a single star located 63 light years away from the Sun in the northern constellation of Boötes. It has the Bayer designation c Boötis; 45 Boötis is the Flamsteed designation. This body is visible to the naked eye as a faint, yellow-white hued star with an apparent visual magnitude of 4.93. It has a relatively high proper motion, traversing the celestial sphere at the rate of 0.247″ per year. The star is moving closer to the Earth with a heliocentric radial velocity of −11 km/s, and is a stream member of the Ursa Major Moving Group.

This is an F-type main-sequence star with a stellar classification of F5 V. It is around 1.6 billion years old and is spinning with a projected rotational velocity of 40 km/s. The star has 1.2 times the mass of the Sun and 1.46 times the Sun's radius. It is radiating 3.3 times the luminosity of the Sun from its photosphere at an effective temperature of 6,435 K. 45 Boötis is a source of X-ray emission.

There is a magnitude 11.53 visual companion at an angular separation of 103.50″ along a position angle (PA) of 40°, as of 2012. A magnitude 10.23 star can be found at a separation of 247.90″ with a PA of 358°, as of 2015.
