= 11 Boötis =

High proper motion white-hued star in the constellation Boötes

Observation data Epoch J2000.0 Equinox ICRS
- Constellation: Boötes
- Right ascension: 14^{h} 01^{m} 10.48072^{s}
- Declination: +27° 23′ 11.7452″
- Apparent magnitude (V): 6.22±0.01

Characteristics
- Evolutionary stage: main sequence
- Spectral type: A7V
- B−V color index: +0.172

Astrometry
Radial velocity (R_{v})	−24.0±4.3 km/s
Proper motion (μ)	RA: −78.929 mas/yr Dec.: +18.638 mas/yr
Parallax (π)	9.8333±0.0866 mas
Distance	332 ± 3 ly (101.7 ± 0.9 pc)
Absolute magnitude (M_{V})	+1.44

Orbit
Period (P)	142.54301±0.17515 d
Eccentricity (e)	0.55834±0.01463
Periastron epoch (T)	2,457,445.023±0.552 JD
Argument of periastron (ω) (secondary)	177.08±1.44°
Semi-amplitude (K_{1}) (primary)	15.252±0.449 km/s

Details
Mass	1.94 M_{☉}
Radius	2.4627^{+0.0543}_{−0.0538} R_{☉}
Luminosity	63.63^{+1.19}_{−1.11} L_{☉}
Surface gravity (log g)	3.93 cgs
Temperature	7,997±272 K
Metallicity [Fe/H]	−0.02 dex
Rotational velocity (v sin i)	123 km/s
Age	914 Myr

Other designations
- 11 Boötis, AG+27° 1336, BD+28°2287, FK5 517, GC 18943, HD 122405, HIP 68478, HR 5263, SAO 83130, TIC 28171319

Database references
SIMBAD	data

11 Boötis (HR 5263; HD 122405) is a spectroscopic binary located in the northern constellation Boötes, the herdsman. With an apparent magnitude of 6.22, it is barely visible to the naked eye even under ideal conditions. The system is located relatively close to the Solar System at a distance of 332 light years, and it is drifting closer with a heliocentric radial velocity of −24 km/s. At its current distance, 11 Boötis' brightness is diminished by an interstellar extinction of only 0.03 magnitudes, and it has an absolute visual magnitude of +1.44.

The visible component has a stellar classification of A7V, indicating that it is an A-type main-sequence star. It has 1.94 times the mass of the Sun and a slightly enlarged radius of 2.46 R_{☉}. It radiates 63.6 times the luminosity of the Sun from its photosphere at an effective temperature of 7,997 K, giving it a white hue when viewed in the night sky. 11 Boötis is slightly metal deficient with an iron abundance 95.5% that of the Sun, and it spins rapidly with a projected rotational velocity of 123 km/s. It is estimated to be 914 million years old. According to Gaia DR3 models, 11 Boötis is a single-lined spectroscopic binary. Both components take 142.54 days to circle around each other in an eccentric orbit.
