= HD 125351 =

Spectroscopic star system in the constellation Boötes

- Location of HD 125351 (circled in red)

Observation data Epoch J2000 Equinox ICRS
- Constellation: Boötes
- Right ascension: 14^{h} 17^{m} 59.81955^{s}
- Declination: +35° 30′ 34.2208″
- Apparent magnitude (V): 4.9660±0.0007

Characteristics
- Evolutionary stage: red giant branch
- Spectral type: K1III

Astrometry
Radial velocity (R_{v})	−21.6±0.3 km/s
Proper motion (μ)	RA: 4.87 mas/yr Dec.: 14.40 mas/yr
Parallax (π)	13.97±0.39 mas
Distance	233 ± 7 ly (72 ± 2 pc)
Absolute magnitude (M_{V})	+0.53

Orbit
Primary	A Boötis Aa1
Name	A Boötis Aa2
Period (P)	212.085 days
Semi-major axis (a)	2.3 mas
Eccentricity (e)	0.570
Inclination (i)	83.5°
Longitude of the node (Ω)	195.2°
Periastron epoch (T)	2,440,286.002
Argument of periastron (ω) (secondary)	224.9°

Details

Aa1
Mass	3.0 M_{☉}
Radius	13 R_{☉}
Luminosity	75 L_{☉}
Surface gravity (log g)	2.25 cgs
Temperature	4,650 K
Metallicity [Fe/H]	−0.03 dex

Aa2
Mass	1.2 M_{☉}

Ab
Mass	1.85 M_{☉}

Other designations
- A Boötis, BD+36°2468, HD 125351, HIP 69879, HR 5361, SAO 64053

Database references
SIMBAD	data

HD 125351 or A Boötis (A Boo) is multiple star system in the constellation Boötes. The system has an apparent magnitude of +4.97, with a spectrum matching a K-type giant star. It is approximately 233 light-years from Earth.

HD 125351 is an astrometric and single-lined spectroscopic binary with a known 212-day orbit. Speckle interferometry has detected a companion at a separation of 0.09″, which is likely to be a different star from the unseen spectroscopic companion. It is 1.45 magnitudes fainter than the visible primary in the near infrared. An orbital period of seven years is suggested. This would make HD 125351 a triple system. Further faint stars at separations of 14″ and 96″ share a common proper motion although any orbits would take many thousands of years.
