= Omega Boötis =

Star in the constellation Boötes

- Location of ω Boötis (circled in red)

Observation data Epoch J2000.0 Equinox J2000.0 (ICRS)
- Constellation: Boötes
- Right ascension: 15^{h} 02^{m} 06.509^{s}
- Declination: +25° 00′ 29.30″
- Apparent magnitude (V): +4.82

Characteristics
- Spectral type: K4 III
- U−B color index: +1.83
- B−V color index: +1.50

Astrometry
Radial velocity (R_{v})	+12.50±0.15 km/s
Proper motion (μ)	RA: −5.535 mas/yr Dec.: −49.18 mas/yr
Parallax (π)	8.5271±0.1118 mas
Distance	382 ± 5 ly (117 ± 2 pc)
Absolute magnitude (M_{V})	−0.41

Details
Mass	1.65 M_{☉}
Radius	38.51±1.09 R_{☉}
Luminosity	340±12 L_{☉}
Surface gravity (log g)	1.37±0.06 cgs
Temperature	3,994±56 K
Metallicity [Fe/H]	−0.10±0.03 dex
Age	2.99 Gyr

Other designations
- ω Boo, 41 Boötis, BD+25°2861, FK5 3185, GC 20224, HD 133124, HIP 73568, HR 5600, SAO 83624

Database references
SIMBAD	data

Omega Boötis is a solitary, orange-hued star in the northern constellation of Boötes. Its name is a Bayer designation that is Latinized from ω Boötis, and abbreviated Omega Boo or ω Boo. This is a dim star but visible to the naked eye with an apparent visual magnitude of +4.82. Based upon an annual parallax shift of 8.53 mas as seen from the Earth, it is located about 382 light-years (117 pc) from the Sun. The star is drifting further away with a radial velocity of +12.5 km/s.

This star is three billion years old with a stellar classification of K4 III, matching an evolved K-type giant star that has consumed the supply of hydrogen at its core. It has an estimated 1.65 times the mass of the Sun and has expanded to 39 times the Sun's radius. The star is radiating 340 times the Sun's luminosity from its photosphere at an effective temperature of about 3,994 K.
