= HD 132563 =

Triple star system in the constellation of Boötes

Observation data Epoch J2000 Equinox ICRS
- Constellation: Boötes
- A
- Right ascension: 14^{h} 58^{m} 21.520^{s}
- Declination: +44° 02′ 35.33″
- Apparent magnitude (V): 8.966
- B
- Right ascension: 14^{h} 58^{m} 21.136^{s}
- Declination: +44° 02′ 35.86″
- Apparent magnitude (V): 9.472

Characteristics
- Spectral type: F8 III
- B−V color index: 0.560

Astrometry

A
Radial velocity (R_{v})	−6.68±0.20 km/s
Proper motion (μ)	RA: −62.790 mas/yr Dec.: −67.676 mas/yr
Parallax (π)	9.4137±0.0155 mas
Distance	346.5 ± 0.6 ly (106.2 ± 0.2 pc)
Absolute magnitude (M_{V})	4.05

B
Radial velocity (R_{v})	6.05±0.20 km/s
Proper motion (μ)	RA: −57.480 mas/yr Dec.: −70.146 mas/yr
Parallax (π)	9.4745±0.0112 mas
Distance	344.2 ± 0.4 ly (105.5 ± 0.1 pc)
Absolute magnitude (M_{V})	4.56

Orbit
Primary	Aa
Name	Ab
Period (P)	47 yr
Semi-major axis (a)	14.8 AU
Eccentricity (e)	0.860
Periastron epoch (T)	B 2012.34
Argument of periastron (ω) (secondary)	160.2°

Orbit
Primary	A
Name	B
Period (P)	4,934 yr
Semi-major axis (a)	4.1" (400 AU)

Details

Aa
Mass	1.081±0.010 M_{☉}
Radius	1.3 R_{☉}
Luminosity	2.4 L_{☉}
Surface gravity (log g)	4.15 cgs
Temperature	6,168±100 K
Metallicity [Fe/H]	−0.18±0.10 dex
Rotational velocity (v sin i)	3.9 km/s
Age	~5 Gyr

Ab
Mass	0.6 M_{☉}

B
Mass	1.010±0.010 M_{☉}
Radius	1.1 R_{☉}
Luminosity	1.5 L_{☉}
Surface gravity (log g)	4.27 cgs
Temperature	5,985±100 K
Metallicity [Fe/H]	−0.19±0.10 dex
Rotational velocity (v sin i)	3.4 km/s

Other designations
- BD+44 2408, HIP 73261, SAO 45312

Database references
SIMBAD	data
- A
- B

HD 132563 is a triple star system in the constellation Boötes. The two resolvable components of this system are designated HD 132563A and HD 132563B. The primary star, HD 132563A, is actually a spectroscopic binary with a period of more than 15 years and an orbital eccentricity of greater than 0.65. The smaller member of this tightly orbiting pair has about 55% the mass of the Sun.

== Stellar system ==
Aa
Period 47 yr
Ab
Separation 400 AU
B

Hierarchy of orbits in the system

HD 132563 can be resolved into two stars with a separation of 4.1″ and magnitudes of 9.0 and 9.5. These two stars have almost identical distances and proper motions and are widely accepted to form a binary system with a separation of about 400 au.

The primary, component A, consists of a star slightly more massive and hotter than the sun and an unseen companion with a mass of about 0.6 M_{☉}. These two stars circle each other in a highly eccentric orbit with separations varying between 2.1 au and 27.5 au Based on evolutionary modelling and isochrone fitting, the primary is right at the end of its main sequence life and starting to expand into a subgiant.

Component B is too far from the primary for orbital motion to have been observed, but it is estimated that an orbit would take about 5,000 years. It is main sequence star very similar to the Sun.

A further 9th-magnitude star 65" from the primary is listed as component C in the Washington Double Star Catalog, but is much further away from us than the triple system.

== Planetary system ==
Based upon radial velocity variations of HD 132563B, the presence of an ordinary giant planet has been inferred by S. Desidera et al. (2011). This object is orbiting the star with a period of 1,544 days, at a distance of about 2.6 AU, and with an orbital eccentricity of 0.22.

The HD 132563 planetary system
Companion (in order from star)	Mass	Semimajor axis (AU)	Orbital period (days)	Eccentricity	Inclination (°)	Radius
b	≥1.49±0.09 M_{J}	2.62±0.04	1,544±34	0.22±0.09	—	—
