= NGC 5008 =

Galaxy in the constellation Boötes

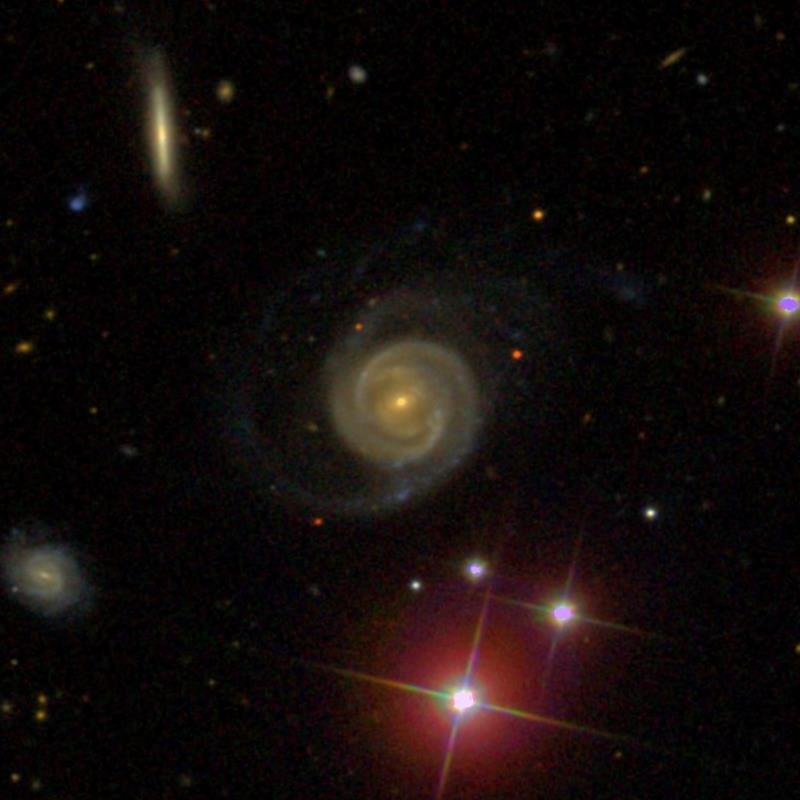
- SDSS image of spiral galaxy NGC 5008

Observation data (J2000 epoch)
- Constellation: Boötes
- Right ascension: 14h 10m 57.24s
- Declination: +25d 29m 50.00s
- Redshift: 0.031015
- Heliocentric radial velocity: 9,308 km/s
- Distance: 525 Mly (160.9 Mpc)
- Group or cluster: Hickson Compact Group 71
- Apparent magnitude (V): 13.7
- Apparent magnitude (B): 14.2
- Surface brightness: 14.07

Characteristics
- Size: 460,000 ly (140.5 kpc) (estimated)

Other designations
- NGC 5008, PGC 50629, IC 4381, UGC 9073, CGCG 133-001, HCG 071A, NSA 094791, MCG +04-33-42, UZC J141057.3+252951, 2MASX J14105726+2529502, SDSS J14105726+2529502, NVSS J141057+252945, HOLM 598A, LEDA 50629

NGC 5008 (also known as IC 4381) is a massive barred spiral galaxy located in the constellation Boötes.

== Details ==
It is located 530 million light-years away from the Solar System and was discovered by Heinrich d'Arrest, a Prussian astronomer on May 18, 1862 as NGC 5008. It was again discovered on June 15, 1895 by Stephane Javelle who listed it in the Index Catalogue as IC 4381. With a diameter of 400,000 light-years, NGC 5008 easily dwarfs the Milky Way and is considered one of the largest galaxies. According to the SIMBAD Database, NGC 5008 has a LINER type active galactic nucleus. It has a surface brightness magnitude of 14.07, meaning it is a low-surface brightness galaxy.

=== Possible central black hole ===
A quasar the mass of about 432 million suns (Radius of 1.834K Suns) take place at the center of NGC 5008. By calculating the Virial theorem and the calculation of luminosity with fluxes, it was possible to calculate the mass of the quasar.

== Group membership ==
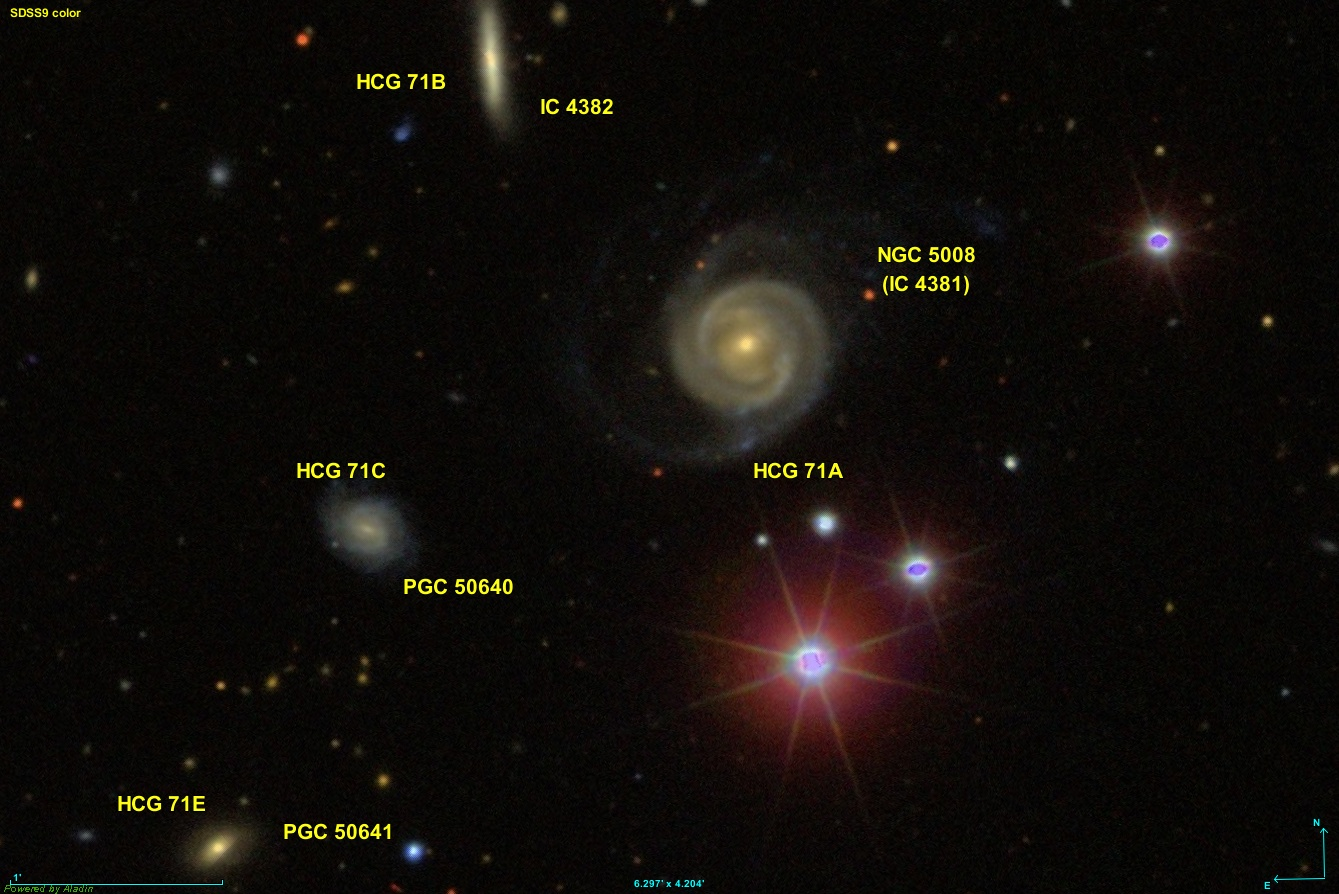
The four galaxies of Hickson compact group 71.

NGC 5008 is the dominant member of the Hickson Compact group, HCG 71. The other members of the group are IC 4382, PGC 50640 and PGC 50641, which is further away compared to the other galaxies.
