= NGC 5548 =

Type I Seyfert galaxy in the constellation Boötes

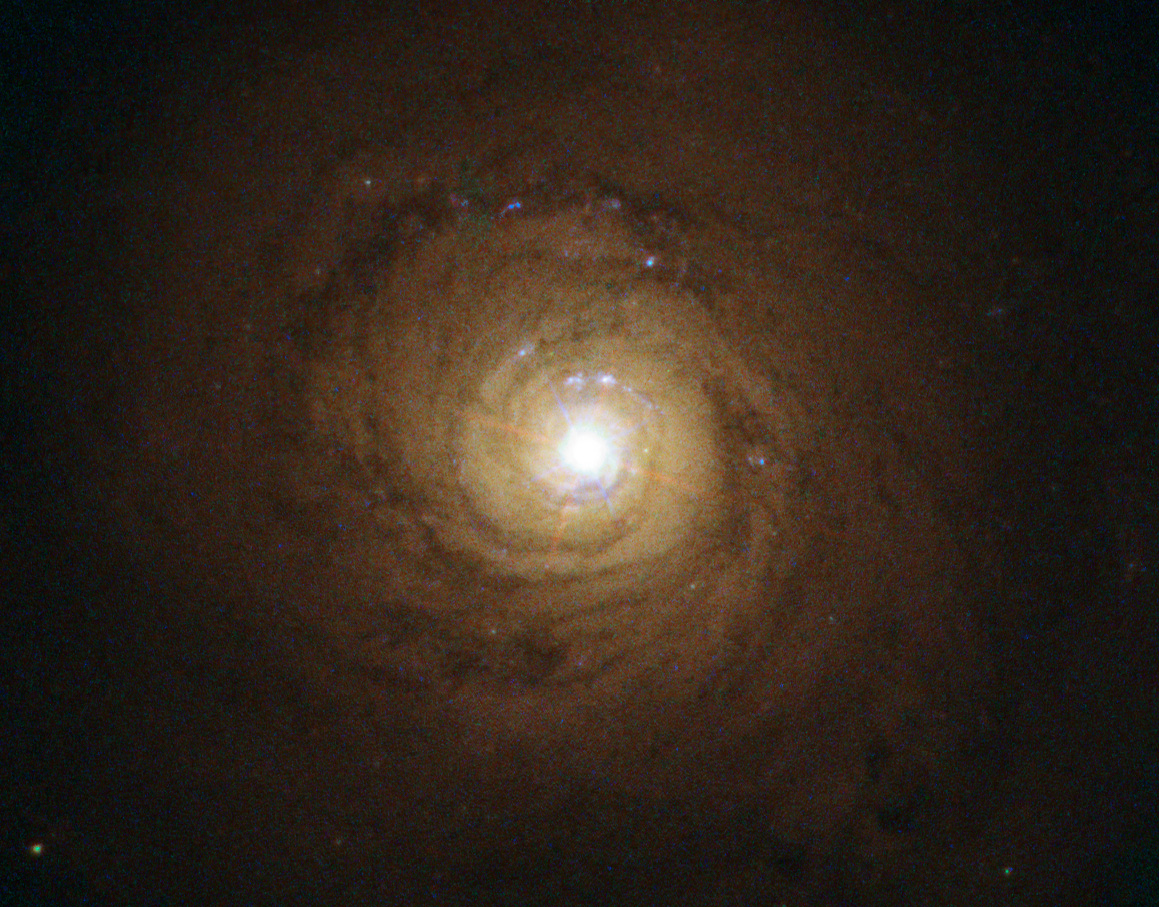
- NGC 5548 image by Hubble.

Observation data (J2000 epoch)
- Constellation: Boötes
- Right ascension: 14^{h} 17^{m} 59.513^{s}
- Declination: +25° 08′ 12.45″
- Redshift: 0.01651 ± 0.00189
- Heliocentric radial velocity: 5,178 km/s
- Distance: 244.6 Mly (75.01 Mpc)
- Apparent magnitude (V): 13.283

Characteristics
- Type: SA0/a pec
- Apparent size (V): 1.7′ × 1.5′
- Notable features: Seyfert galaxy; radio jet

Other designations
- Mrk 1509, UGC 9149

NGC 5548 is a Type I Seyfert galaxy with a bright, active nucleus. This activity is caused by matter flowing onto a 65 million solar mass (M_{☉}) supermassive black hole at the core. Morphologically, this is an unbarred lenticular galaxy with tightly-wound spiral arms, while shell and tidal tail features suggest that it has undergone a cosmologically-recent merger or interaction event. NGC 5548 is approximately 245 million light years away and appears in the constellation Boötes. The apparent visual magnitude of NGC 5548 is approximately 13.3 in the V band.

In 1943, this galaxy was one of twelve nebulae listed by American astronomer Carl Keenan Seyfert that showed broad emission lines in their nuclei. Members of this class of objects became known as Seyfert galaxies, and they were noted to have a higher than normal surface brightness in their nuclei. Observation of NGC 5548 during the 1960s with radio telescopes showed an enhanced level of radio emission. Spectrograms of the nucleus made in 1966 showed that the energized region was confined to a volume a few parsecs across, where temperature were around 14000 K and the plasma had a dispersion velocity of ±450 km/s.

Among astronomers, the accepted explanation for the active nucleus in NGC 5548 is the accretion of matter onto a supermassive black hole (SMBH) at the core. This object is surrounded by an orbiting disk of accreted matter drawn in from the surroundings. As material is drawn into the outer parts of this disk, it becomes photoionized, producing broad emission lines in the optical and ultraviolet bands of the electromagnetic spectrum. A wind of ionized matter, organized in filamentary structures at distances of 1–14 light days from the center, is flowing outward in the direction perpendicular to the accretion disk plane.

The mass of the central black hole can be estimated based on the properties of the emission lines in the core region. Combined measurements yield an estimated mass of 6.54+0.26
−0.25×10^{7} M_{☉}. In other words, it is some 65 million times the mass of the Sun. This result is consistent with other methods of estimating the mass of the SMBH in the nucleus of NGC 5548. Matter is falling onto this black hole at the estimated rate of 0.03 M_{☉} per year, whereas mass is flowing outward from the core at or above the rate of 0.92 M_{☉} each year. The inner part of the accretion disk surrounding the SMBH forms a thick, hot corona spanning several light hours that is emitting X-rays. When this radiation reaches the optically thick part of the accretion disk at a radius of around 1–2 light days, the X-rays are converted into heat.
