= Pi Boötis =

Star in the constellation Boötes

- Location of π Boötis (circled in red)

Observation data Epoch J2000 Equinox ICRS
- Constellation: Boötes
- Right ascension: 14^{h} 40^{m} 43.559^{s}
- Declination: +16° 25′ 05.98″
- Apparent magnitude (V): 4.49 (4.893 + 5.761)

Characteristics
- Spectral type: B9 IIIp (MnHgSi) + A6 V
- U−B color index: −0.31
- B−V color index: −0.002±0.010
- R−I color index: −0.02

Astrometry
Radial velocity (R_{v})	−1.1±0.8 km/s
Proper motion (μ)	RA: +13.922 mas/yr Dec.: +15.566 mas/yr
Parallax (π)	10.3357±0.1199 mas
Distance	316 ± 4 ly (97 ± 1 pc)
Absolute magnitude (M_{V})	–0.39

Details

π^{1} Boo
Mass	3.49±0.14 M_{☉}
Radius	3.2±0.4 R_{☉}
Luminosity	214 L_{☉}
Surface gravity (log g)	3.99±0.18 cgs
Temperature	12,052±456 K
Metallicity [Fe/H]	+0.18±0.17 dex
Rotational velocity (v sin i)	14.0 km/s

π^{2} Boo
Surface gravity (log g)	3.60±0.01 cgs
Temperature	7504^{+21}_{−17} K
Metallicity [Fe/H]	0.580 dex
Rotational velocity (v sin i)	144 km/s

Other designations
- π Boo, 29 Boötis, BD+17°2768, HIP 71762, ADS 9338
- π^{1} Boötis: HD 129174, HR 5475, SAO 101138
- π^{2} Boötis: HD 129175, HR 5476, SAO 101139

Database references
SIMBAD	π^{1} Boo
- π^{2} Boo

Pi Boötis is a candidate triple star system in the northern constellation of Boötes. Its name is a Bayer designation that is Latinized from π Boötis, and abbreviated Pi Boo or π Boo. This system is visible to the naked eye as a point of light with a combined apparent visual magnitude of 4.50. Based upon an annual parallax shift of 10.67 mas as seen from Earth, it is located roughly 316 light years from the Sun.

The brighter primary, component π^{1} Boötis, has a visual magnitude of 4.89 and a stellar classification of B9 IIIp (MnHgSi), which suggests it is an evolved blue-white hued B-type giant star. It is a chemically peculiar star of the HgMn type, with a spectrum that displays anomalous overabundances of mercury, manganese, and silicon. This component is most likely a single-lined spectroscopic binary with an unknown companion.

Its magnitude 5.76 visible companion, π^{2} Boötis, is a white-hued A-type main-sequence star with a class of A6 V. It is spinning rapidly with a projected rotational velocity of 144 km/s. As of 2010, the pair were separated by 5.537±0.003 arcseconds on the sky along a position angle of 110.5°±0.5°. This corresponds to a projected separation of 538.6±47.7 AU. The odds that is a mere chance alignment is 0.85%.

Pi Boötis has the Chinese traditional star name 左攝提二 (Zuǒ shè tí èr).
