= 2 Boötis =

Star in the constellation Boötes

Observation data Epoch J2000.0 Equinox ICRS
- Constellation: Bootes
- Right ascension: 13^{h} 41^{m} 02.34661^{s}
- Declination: +22° 29′ 44.7744″
- Apparent magnitude (V): 5.63

Characteristics
- Evolutionary stage: red clump
- Spectral type: K0 III
- B−V color index: 1.009

Astrometry
Radial velocity (R_{v})	+4.00±0.16 km/s
Proper motion (μ)	RA: −17.353 mas/yr Dec.: −25.324 mas/yr
Parallax (π)	9.6708±0.1033 mas
Distance	337 ± 4 ly (103 ± 1 pc)
Absolute magnitude (M_{V})	0.57

Details
Mass	1.93±0.18 M_{☉}
Radius	10.04±0.68 R_{☉}
Luminosity	60.3+15.6 −12.4 L_{☉}
Surface gravity (log g)	2.77±0.07 cgs
Temperature	4,867±31 K
Metallicity [Fe/H]	−0.05±0.03 dex
Rotational velocity (v sin i)	2.21±0.45 km/s
Age	1.33±0.27 Gyr

Other designations
- 2 Boo, BD+23°2600, HD 119126, HIP 66763, HR 5149, SAO 82946

Database references
SIMBAD	data

2 Boötis is a single star in the northern constellation of Boötes, located 337 light years away from the Sun. It is visible to the naked eye as a faint, yellow-hued star with an apparent visual magnitude of 5.63. This object is moving further from the Earth with a heliocentric radial velocity of +4 km/s.

At the age of 1.33 billion years old, this is an evolved giant star with a stellar classification of K0 III, having exhausted the hydrogen at its core and expanded off the main sequence. It has 1.9 times the mass of the Sun with ten times the Sun's radius. The star is radiating 60 times the luminosity of the Sun from its enlarged photosphere at an effective temperature of 4,867 K.
