= NGC 5886 =

Galaxy in the constellation Boötes

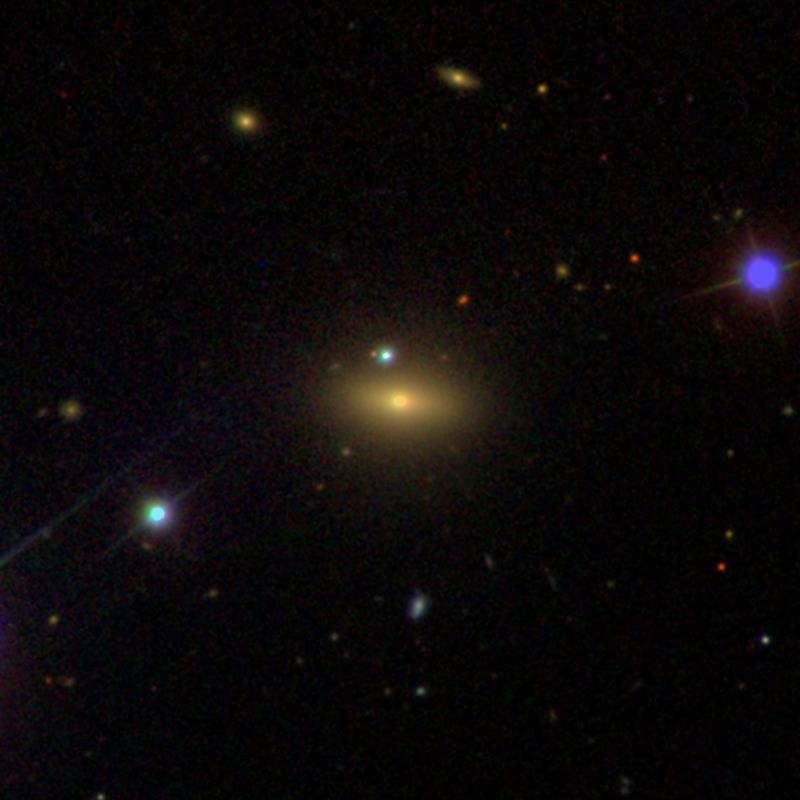
- SDSS image of NGC 5886

Observation data (J2000 epoch)
- Constellation: Boötes
- Right ascension: 15^{h} 12^{m} 45.453^{s}
- Declination: +41° 14′ 00.87″
- Redshift: 0.02784
- Heliocentric radial velocity: 8230 km/s
- Distance: 406.6 ± 28.5 Mly (124.66 ± 8.73 Mpc)
- Apparent magnitude (B): 14.87

Characteristics
- Type: E0

Other designations
- PGC 54298, CGCG 221-036

NGC 5886 is an +14 magnitude elliptical galaxy in the constellation Boötes. It was originally discovered by John Herschel on 13 May 1828 with an 18.7 inches (470 mm) reflector.

NGC 5886, together with NGC 5888, form a gravitationally bound pair of galaxies.

== Supernova ==
One supernova has been observed in NGC 5886: SN 2020nln (Type Ia, mag. 18.12) was discovered by the Zwicky Transient Facility on 25 June 2020.

== See also ==
- List of NGC objects (5001–6000)
