= ZZ Boötis =

Eclipsing binary

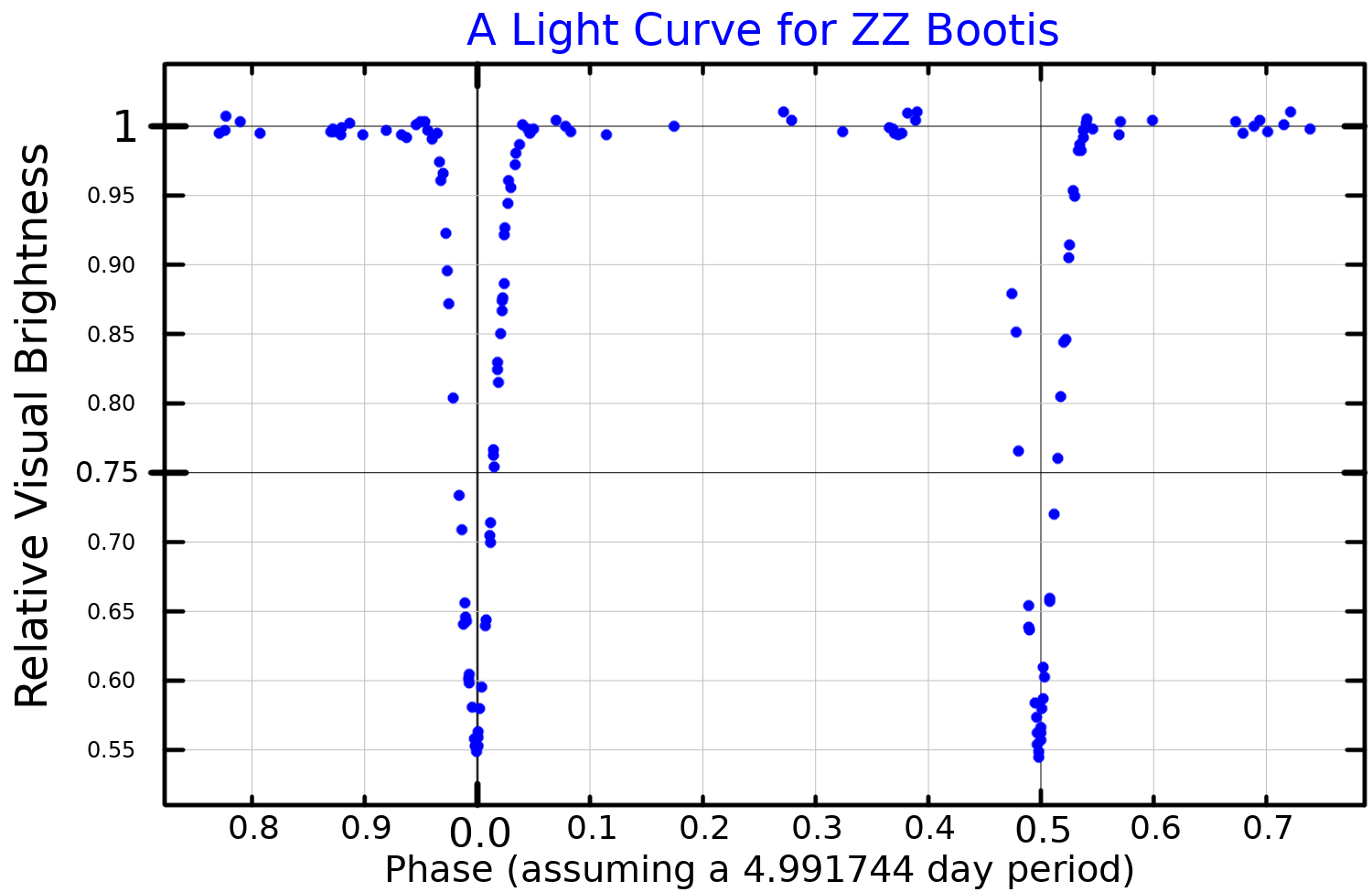
- A visual band light curve for ZZ Boötes, adapted from McNamara et al. (1971)

Observation data Epoch J2000 Equinox ICRS
- Constellation: Boötes
- Right ascension: 13^{h} 56^{m} 09.5178^{s}
- Declination: +25° 55′ 07.3547″
- Apparent magnitude (V): 6.79–7.44

Characteristics
- Spectral type: F2 IV-V + F2 IV-V
- B−V color index: +0.36
- Variable type: Algol

Astrometry
Radial velocity (R_{v})	−29.50 km/s
Proper motion (μ)	RA: −97.004±0.057 mas/yr Dec.: −6.164±0.061 mas/yr
Parallax (π)	9.3114±0.0381 mas
Distance	350 ± 1 ly (107.4 ± 0.4 pc)
Absolute bolometric magnitude (M_{bol})	2.507 / 2.382

Orbit
Period (P)	4.99176522 ± 0.00000010 d
Semi-major axis (a)	18.024 ± 0.035 R_{☉}
Eccentricity (e)	0.0
Inclination (i)	88.6361 ± 0.0044°
Semi-amplitude (K_{1}) (primary)	93.7 ± 2.1 km/s
Semi-amplitude (K_{2}) (secondary)	94.0 ± 2.1 km/s

Details

ZZ Boo A
Mass	1.5572 ± 0.0080 M_{☉}
Radius	2.0626 ± 0.0057 R_{☉}
Luminosity	10.7 L_{☉}
Surface gravity (log g)	4.0016 ± 0.0019 cgs
Temperature	6,720 ± 100 K
Metallicity [Fe/H]	−0.10 ± 0.08 dex
Rotational velocity (v sin i)	20.905 ± 0.058 km/s

ZZ Boo B
Mass	1.599 ± 0.012 M_{☉}
Radius	2.2050 ± 0.0062 R_{☉}
Luminosity	9.95 L_{☉}
Surface gravity (log g)	3.9550 ± 0.0023 cgs
Temperature	6,690 ± 100 K
Metallicity [Fe/H]	−0.03 ± 0.10 dex
Rotational velocity (v sin i)	22.348 ± 0.062 km/s

Other designations
- ZZ Boo, HD 121648, HIP 68064, SAO 83080, BD+26°2508

Database references
SIMBAD	data

ZZ Boötis is a star system in the constellation Boötes. It varies from magnitude 6.79 to 7.44 over five days. Based on its parallax, measured by the Gaia spacecraft, it is about 350 light-years (110 parsecs) away.

== Observational history ==
In 1950 Grigory Shajn determined that this star is a double-lined spectroscopic binary, with an approximate period of 4.96 days. Sergei Gaposchkin found from an examination of photographic plates, in 1951, that it was an Algol-type eclipsing binary system. The primary and secondary eclipses are of equal depth, 0.65 magnitudes, meaning the brightness drops by nearly half. The eclipses make up only 6% of the orbital period.

ZZ Boötis is a binary star system, specifically an eclipsing binary. The component stars appear to be of almost equal mass, differing by only 3%.
