= 9 Boötis =

Star in the constellation Boötes

Observation data Epoch J2000 Equinox ICRS
- Constellation: Boötes
- Right ascension: 13^{h} 56^{m} 34.18103^{s}
- Declination: +27° 29′ 31.4932″
- Apparent magnitude (V): 5.02

Characteristics
- Evolutionary stage: AGB
- Spectral type: K3 III
- B−V color index: 1.441±0.005
- Variable type: suspected irregular

Astrometry
Radial velocity (R_{v})	−41.07±0.14 km/s
Proper motion (μ)	RA: +28.154 mas/yr Dec.: −48.279 mas/yr
Parallax (π)	5.2113±0.1011 mas
Distance	630 ± 10 ly (192 ± 4 pc)
Absolute magnitude (M_{V})	−1.23

Details
Mass	3.5±0.5 M_{☉}
Radius	44 R_{☉}
Luminosity	857 L_{☉}
Surface gravity (log g)	1.85 cgs
Temperature	4,197 K
Metallicity [Fe/H]	−0.27 dex
Rotational velocity (v sin i)	1.5 km/s

Other designations
- 9 Boo, NSV 6502, BD+28°2278, GC 18850, HD 121710, HIP 68103, HR 5247, SAO 83084

Database references
SIMBAD	data

9 Boötis is a single, variable star in the northern constellation of Boötes, located around 630 light years away from the Sun. It is visible to the naked eye as a faint, orange-hued star with an apparent visual magnitude of 5.0. This object is moving closer to the Earth with a heliocentric radial velocity of −41 km/s.

This is an aging giant star with a stellar classification of K3 III, which indicates it has exhausted the hydrogen at its core and evolved of the main sequence. As a consequence, its outer atmosphere has swollen to 44 times the radius of the Sun. It is a suspected irregular variable that ranges in photographic magnitude from 6.1 down to 6.6. 9 Boötis is considered mildly lithium-rich with a moderate level of chromospheric activity. It is radiating 857 times the luminosity of the Sun from its enlarged photosphere at an effective temperature of 4,197 K.
