= 20 Boötis =

Star in the constellation Boötes

- Location of 20 Boötis (circled in red)

Observation data Epoch J2000 Equinox ICRS
- Constellation: Boötes
- Right ascension: 14^{h} 19^{m} 45.23505^{s}
- Declination: +16° 18′ 24.9955″
- Apparent magnitude (V): 4.84

Characteristics
- Evolutionary stage: red clump
- Spectral type: K3 III
- B−V color index: 1.228±0.001

Astrometry
Radial velocity (R_{v})	−8.25±0.43 km/s
Proper motion (μ)	RA: –141.521 mas/yr Dec.: +60.274 mas/yr
Parallax (π)	17.8379±0.1894 mas
Distance	183 ± 2 ly (56.1 ± 0.6 pc)
Absolute magnitude (M_{V})	1.01±0.09

Details
Mass	1.14±0.19 M_{☉}
Radius	12.18+0.26 −0.36 R_{☉}
Luminosity	51.99±0.66 L_{☉}
Surface gravity (log g)	2.36±0.08 cgs
Temperature	4,472 K
Metallicity [Fe/H]	0.16 dex
Rotation	848 days
Rotational velocity (v sin i)	1.0 km/s
Age	5.21±2.28 Gyr

Other designations
- 20 Boo, NSV 6631, BD+16°2637, FK5 3135, GC 19334, GJ 3841, HD 125560, HIP 70027, HR 5370, SAO 100980

Database references
SIMBAD	data

20 Boötis is a single star in the northern constellation of Boötes, located 183 light years away from the Sun. It is visible to the naked eye as a faint, orange-hued star with an apparent visual magnitude of 4.84. The star has a relatively high proper motion, traversing the celestial sphere at the rate of 0.154 arc seconds per annum. It is moving closer to the Earth with a heliocentric radial velocity of −8 km/s.

This is an aging K-type giant star with a stellar classification of K3 III. It is a red clump giant, which indicates it is on the horizontal branch and is generating energy through helium fusion at its core. The star is around five billion years old with 1.1 times the mass of the Sun and has expanded to 12 times the Sun's radius. It is radiating 52 times the luminosity of the Sun from its swollen photosphere at an effective temperature of 4,472 K.
