= T Boötis =

Nova seen in 1860

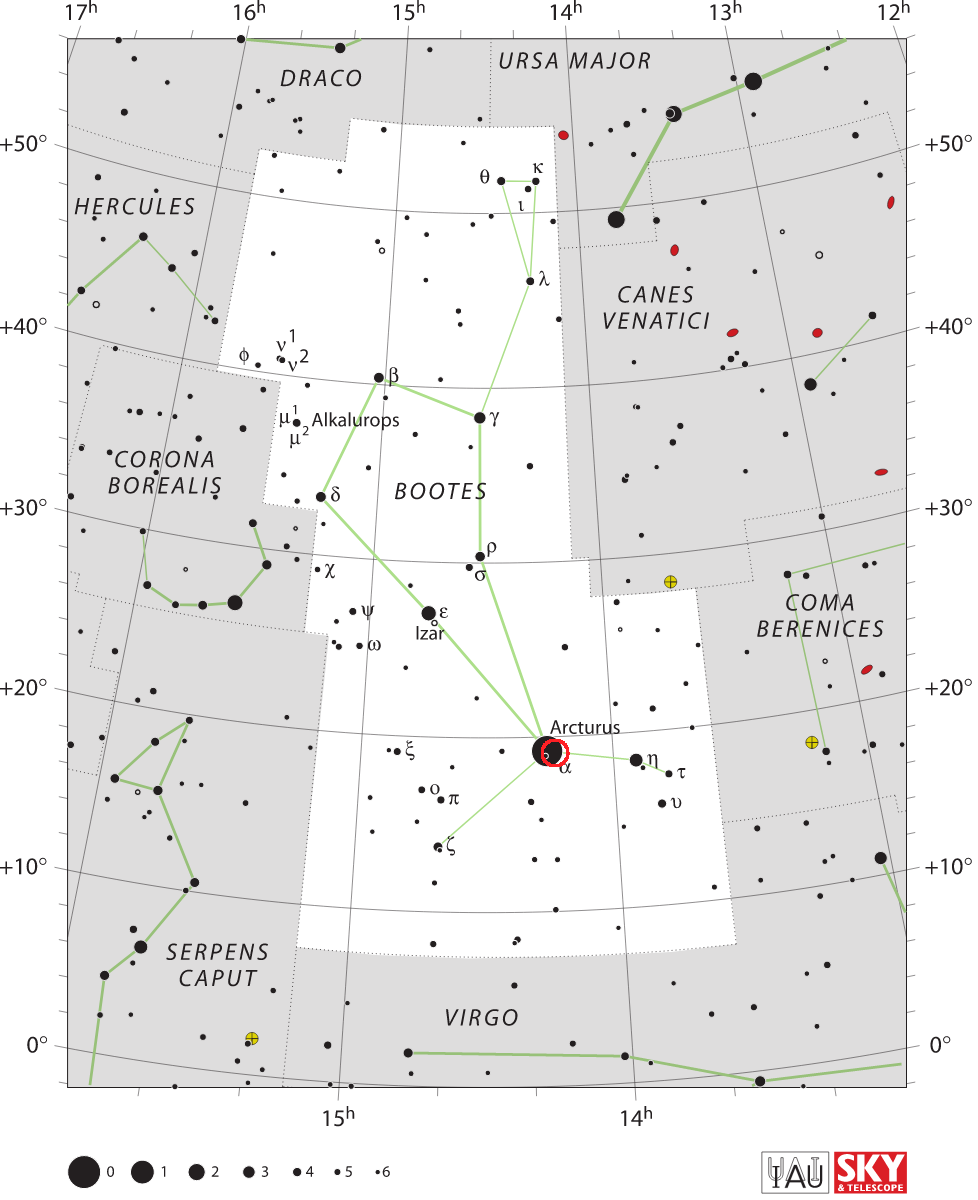
- Location of T Boötes (circled in red)

Observation data Epoch J2000.0 Equinox J2000.0 (ICRS)
- Constellation: Boötes
- Right ascension: 14^{h} 14^{m} 07.00^{s}
- Declination: +19° 04′ 00.0″
- Apparent magnitude (V): 9.7-<20.4

Characteristics
- Variable type: N (Nova)

Other designations
- AAVSO 1409+19, BD+19 2768

Database references
SIMBAD	data

T Boötis is believed to have been a nova. It was observed by only one person, Joseph Baxendell, on 9, 11 and 22 April 1860, but has not been seen since. It is located less than half a degree from Arcturus in the constellation Boötes and was at magnitude 9.75 when first seen, and magnitude 12.8 when last seen. Other astronomers, including Friedrich Winnecke, Edward Charles Pickering, Ernst Hartwig and Ernst Zinner looked for a star in this location without success.

Despite being usually referred to as a nova, it had characteristics that set it apart from other novae: an amplitude of at least 7 magnitudes, an unusually rapid decline in brightness and a location unusually far from the Galactic plane. Joseph Ashbrook suggested in 1953 that it may be a recurrent nova which has been observed only once.
