= 44 Boötis =

Triple star system in the constellation Boötes

- Location of 44 Boötis (circled in red)

Observation data Epoch J2000 Equinox ICRS
- Constellation: Boötes
- Right ascension: 15^{h} 03^{m} 47.29565^{s}
- Declination: +47° 39′ 14.6228″
- Apparent magnitude (V): 4.70 - 4.84 (5.136 / 6.004)

Characteristics
- Spectral type: G0Vnv + (K0V + K4V)
- U−B color index: 0.09
- B−V color index: 0.65
- Variable type: W UMa

Astrometry
Radial velocity (R_{v})	−17.89 km/s
Proper motion (μ)	RA: −445.84 mas/yr Dec.: 19.86 mas/yr
Parallax (π)	78.39±1.03 mas
Distance	41.6 ± 0.5 ly (12.8 ± 0.2 pc)
Absolute magnitude (M_{V})	+2.211 / +5.38

Orbit
Primary	44 Boo A
Name	44 Boo B
Period (P)	209.8±3.3 yr
Semi-major axis (a)	3.666±0.021″
Eccentricity (e)	0.5111±0.0065
Inclination (i)	83.55±0.05°
Longitude of the node (Ω)	57.14±0.06°
Periastron epoch (T)	B 2012.04±0.26
Argument of periastron (ω) (secondary)	39.86±0.68°

Orbit
Primary	44 Boo Ba
Name	44 Boo Bb
Period (P)	0.267818 days
Semi-major axis (a)	2.015 R_{☉}
Eccentricity (e)	0.0
Inclination (i)	72.8°
Semi-amplitude (K_{1}) (primary)	231.31 km/s
Semi-amplitude (K_{2}) (secondary)	112.70 km/s

Details

44 Boo A
Mass	1.04±0.10 M_{☉}
Luminosity	1.552 L_{☉}
Surface gravity (log g)	4.33 cgs
Temperature	5,877 K
Metallicity [Fe/H]	−0.24 dex
Age	1.4–1.5 Gyr

44 Boo Ba
Mass	0.98 M_{☉}
Radius	0.87 R_{☉}
Luminosity	0.51 L_{☉}
Temperature	5,300 K

44 Boo Bb
Mass	0.55 M_{☉}
Radius	0.66 R_{☉}
Luminosity	0.24 L_{☉}
Temperature	5,035 K

Other designations
- Quadrans, i Boötis, 44 Boo, BD+48°2259, FK5 3182, GJ 575, HD 133640, HIP 73695, HR 5618, SAO 45357, ADS 9494, CCDM 15038+4739

Database references
SIMBAD	data
- A
- B

44 Boötis, also known as i Boötis, is a triple star system in the constellation Boötes. It is approximately 41.6 light years from Earth. Its three components are designated 44 Boötis A (with the proper name Quadrans), 44 Boötis Ba, and 44 Boötis Bb.

44 Boötis B is a contact binary of the W Ursae Majoris type. It is the nearest contact binary star.

== Nomenclature ==
44 Boötis is the star's Flamsteed designation; it also has the Bayer designation i Boötis.

This star was a member of the obsolete constellation Quadrans Muralis. The IAU Working Group on Star Names approved the name Quadrans for the primary component of the system 44 Boötis A on 17 February 2025, after the obsolete constellation, and it is now so entered in the IAU Catalog of Star Names.

== Description ==
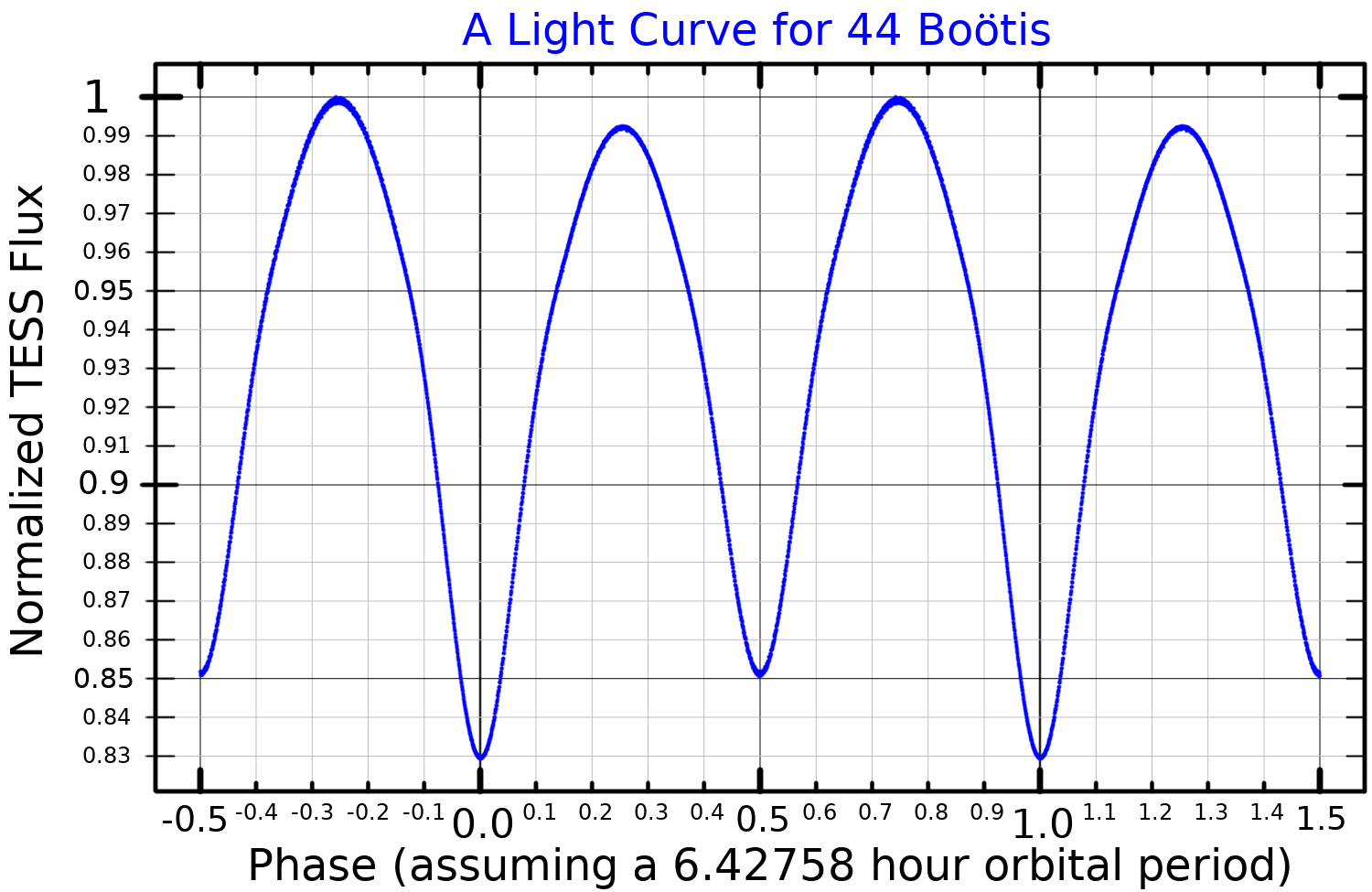
A light curve for 44 Boötis plotted from TESS data

44 Boötis can be resolved into two stars, of 5th and 6th magnitudes respectively. They were separated by 1.5″ when the pair were confirmed in 1819, but were only 0.2″ by 2020 as the two orbit every 210 years.

The primary component, 44 Boötis A, is a yellow-white G-type main sequence star with a mean apparent magnitude of +4.83. The companion component, 44 Boötis B, is a W Ursae Majoris variable spectroscopic binary. The variability of this star system was discovered by English astronomer William Herschel. The brightness of the eclipsing binary varies from magnitude +5.8 to +6.40 with a period of 6.43 hours. The two eclipsing components of the system are close enough to allow their stellar envelopes to overlap, or at least nearly so. In 1948, flare behavior was measured from this system based on data from O. J. Eggen.

A 2016 study reported a possible detection of an infrared excess, implying the existence of a dust disk that absorbs visible light and re-emits it as infrared light. The dust would have a blackbody temperature of about 23 K, situated up to 182 au from the parent star. However, this detection was considered dubious by the original study, and a 2019 study reported a non-detection.
