= 12 Boötis =

Binary in the constellation Boötes

- Location of 12 Boötis (circled)

Observation data Epoch J2000 Equinox ICRS
- Constellation: Boötes
- Right ascension: 14^{h} 10^{m} 23.93342^{s}
- Declination: +25° 05′ 30.0394″
- Apparent magnitude (V): 4.83

Characteristics
- Spectral type: F9IVw
- U−B color index: +0.07
- B−V color index: +0.54

Astrometry
Radial velocity (R_{v})	+9.646±0.013 km/s
Proper motion (μ)	RA: −23.43 mas/yr Dec.: −59.79 mas/yr
Parallax (π)	27.917±0.044 mas
Distance	116.8 ± 0.2 ly (35.82 ± 0.06 pc)
Absolute magnitude (M_{V})	2.00

Orbit
Primary	12 Boo Aa
Name	12 Boo Ab
Period (P)	9.6045601±0.0000036 d
Semi-major axis (a)	3.4706±0.0055 mas
Eccentricity (e)	0.19214±0.00015
Inclination (i)	107.95±0.12°
Longitude of the node (Ω)	80.49±0.10°
Periastron epoch (T)	2,454,100.43572±0.00070
Argument of periastron (ω) (secondary)	286.832±0.029°
Semi-amplitude (K_{1}) (primary)	67.189±0.011 km/s
Semi-amplitude (K_{2}) (secondary)	69.311±0.014 km/s

Details

12 Boo Aa
Mass	1.4109±0.0028 M_{☉}
Radius	2.450 R_{☉}
Luminosity	7.531 L_{☉}
Surface gravity (log g)	3.73 cgs
Temperature	6115 K
Metallicity [Fe/H]	−0.065 dex

12 Boo Ab
Mass	1.3677±0.0028 M_{☉}
Radius	1.901 R_{☉}
Luminosity	4.692 L_{☉}
Temperature	6200 K
Metallicity [Fe/H]	−0.065 dex

Other designations
- d Boötis, 12 Boötis, FK5 522, GC 19127, HIP 69226, HR 5304, HD 123999, GJ 9470, BD+25°2737, SAO 83203, WDS J14104+2506AB, CCDM 14104+2505

Database references
SIMBAD	data

12 Boötis is a spectroscopic binary in the constellation Boötes. It is approximately 122 light years from Earth.

12 Boötis is a yellow-white F-type subgiant with an apparent magnitude of +4.82. It is a spectroscopic binary pair which orbit around its centre of mass once every 9.6045 days, with an estimated separation of 0.0035". The two stars have similar masses around 1.4 M_{☉}, both are slightly hotter than the Sun and about twice as large.

A further companion, 12 Boötis B, was reported with a separation of approximately one arcsecond in 1989, but subsequent surveys have repeatedly failed to detect this companion.

== See also ==
- Image 12 Boötis
