= Upsilon Boötis =

Star in the constellation Boötes

- Location of υ Boötis (circled)

Observation data Epoch J2000.0 Equinox J2000.0 (ICRS)
- Constellation: Boötes
- Right ascension: 13^{h} 49^{m} 28.641^{s}
- Declination: +15° 47′ 52.46″
- Apparent magnitude (V): 4.023

Characteristics
- Evolutionary stage: Red giant branch
- Spectral type: K5.5 III
- U−B color index: +1.893
- B−V color index: +1.518

Astrometry
Radial velocity (R_{v})	−5.94±0.26 km/s
Proper motion (μ)	RA: −93.269 mas/yr Dec.: +40.166 mas/yr
Parallax (π)	13.4228±0.1380 mas
Distance	243 ± 2 ly (74.5 ± 0.8 pc)
Absolute bolometric magnitude (M_{bol})	−1.44±0.14

Details
Mass	1.11±0.33 M_{☉}
Radius	40.72+0.77 −0.79 R_{☉}
Luminosity	332±54 L_{☉}
Surface gravity (log g)	1.5 cgs
Temperature	3,920 K
Metallicity [Fe/H]	−0.23 dex
Rotational velocity (v sin i)	5.1 km/s
Age	10.08±1.41 Gyr

Other designations
- υ Boo, 5 Boötis, BD+16°2564, GC 18674, HD 120477, HIP 67459, HR 5200, SAO 100725, PPM 130100

Database references
SIMBAD	data

Upsilon Boötis is a single, orange-hued star in the northern constellation of Boötes. Its name is a Bayer designation that is Latinized from υ Boötis, and abbreviated Upsilon Boo or υ Boo. This is a fourth magnitude star that is visible to the naked eye. Based upon an annual parallax shift of 12.38 mas as seen from the Earth, it is located about 243 light-years (75 pc) distant. The star is moving closer to the Sun with a radial velocity of −6 km/s.

This is an evolved K-type giant star with a stellar classification of K5.5 III. Astroseismology was used to obtain a mass estimate of 1.11 times the mass of the Sun, while interferometric measurements give a size of about 38 times the Sun's radius. It is radiating about 332 times the Sun's luminosity from its enlarged photosphere at an effective temperature of 3,920 K. The star is roughly 10 billion years old and is spinning with a projected rotational velocity of 5.1 km/s.
