= Charles Morse Huffer =

American astronomer and instructor

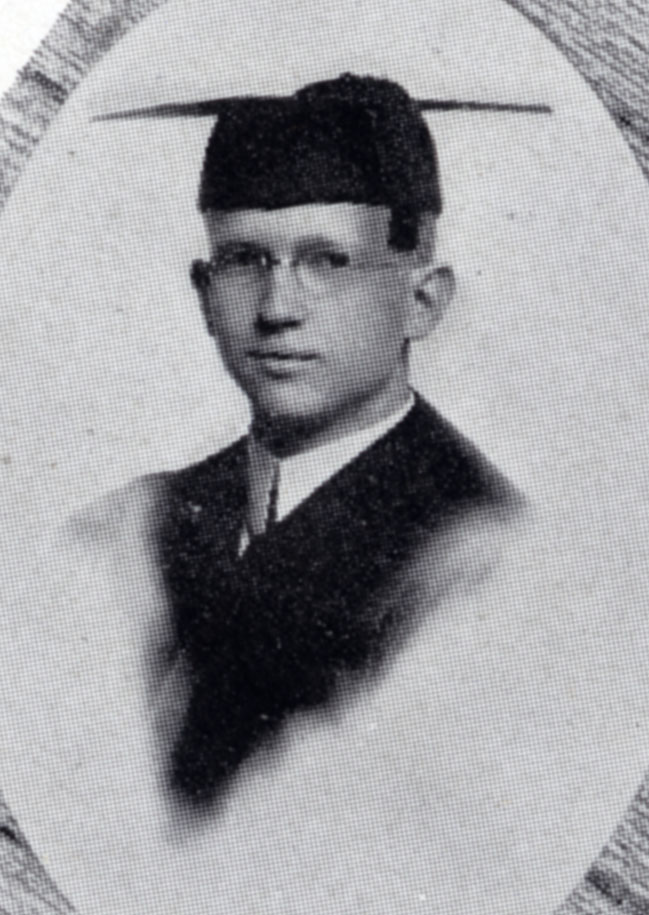
- Huffer's 1916 Albion College Graduation Picture
- Born: June 28, 1894; Edinburgh, Indiana
- Died: March 9, 1981 (aged 86); Madison, Wisconsin
- Resting place: Forest Hill Cemetery, Madison, Wisconsin
- Education: Albion College (A.B.); University of Illinois at Chicago (M.A.); University of Wisconsin–Madison (Ph.D.)
- Known for: Pioneer of Photoelectric Photometry
- Spouse(s): Ruth Triby (d. 1923); Elizabeth Hart
- Children: Helen (by Ruby), John Charles, James Morse
- Scientific career
- Fields: Astronomy
- Institutions: Washburn Observatory
- Thesis: Photo-Electric Studies of Four Variable Stars (1926)

Charles Morse Huffer (June 28, 1894 – March 9, 1981) was an American astronomer, instructor, and author. He was named emeritus professor of astronomy at the University of Wisconsin–Madison.

== Biography ==
He was born in Edinburgh, Indiana, the first son of Presbyterian minister Charles Huffer and his wife Nellie Morse. His grandfather, Frank Lyford Morse, was a professor of mathematics at Hanover College. His father also had a strong interest in mathematics. Charles attended Albion College in Michigan, where he studied mathematics and graduated with an A.B. degree in 1916. Professor E. Roscoe Sleight at Albion arranged a graduate scholarship for Huffer to attend the University of Illinois.

While studying at the University of Illinois he attended an astronomy course taught by Joel Stebbins, the director of the University observatory. The class size was small and the two got to know each other, which would lead to future collaboration. The director of Lick Observatory, W. W. Campbell, wrote to Stebbins letting him know he needed a volunteer for a position at an observatory in Chile. Stebbins wrote back suggesting Huffer for the position, and, after the student graduated in 1917 with a Master of Arts in mathematics, he accepted the opportunity.

In July 1917, Huffer left to join the University of California's D. O. Mills Expedition to the Southern Hemisphere at Santiago, Chile, where he assisted astronomer Ralph E. Wilson. When Wilson suddenly resigned in July 1918, Huffer was left to run the station for a year. While at Santiago, Huffer met the woman who would be his first wife, Ruth Triby from Indiana, a teacher for a local mission school for girls. They would have a daughter, Helen, in 1921.

During his time in Chile, Huffer's interest in astronomy grew, which would determine the path of his future career. After five years he returned to the States where he accepted a position as an assistant to Stebbins. As a graduate student, he taught a newly formed undergraduate course on astronomy, while working as a photometrist for Stebbins at the Washburn Observatory. Not only was he noted to be a good observer, but he genuinely appeared to enjoy teaching. His first task was setting up the photometry equipment (that has been transferred from Illinois) on the school's 15 inch refractor telescope.

In his first year at Washburn, his pregnant wife died due to kidney failure, leaving him to raise their daughter alone. Huffer decided to focus himself on his work and studies. He received his Ph.D. in 1926 with a thesis titled, Photo-Electric Studies of Four Variable Stars. This was the first doctorate in astronomy awarded by the university. Despite his career path, he retained an interest in mathematics. It was while auditing a class on complex variables in 1928 that he met Elizabeth Hart, who also held a master's degree in mathematics. The two shared an interest in golf, and a game became their first date. The two were married, and would have sons John Charles, born 1929, and James Morse, born 1934.

Huffer spent the late 1920s measuring the variability of late type stars, particularly red giants. During the period 1933–41, Stebbins, Huffer, and Albert Whitford performed time-consuming research on the photometry of interstellar reddening. This involved measuring the colors of 1,332 B-type stars to determine how much their blue wavelengths became more attenuated with distance. A relationship was discovered between the position of the stars with respect to the Milky Way and the amount of reddening. Once the United States entered World War II, Huffer taught navigation to navy personnel and worked as a mathematician at the Badger Ordinance Depot. Despite this work, he continued to perform photoelectric measurements at the observatory, particularly on eclipsing binaries.

Following the war, he became secretary of the American Astronomical Society from 1946 until 1955. This involved much travel and planning for meetings. Stebbins retired from the university in 1948, and the same year Huffer became Full Professor. Huffer continued to teach at the university, and worked productively with one of his students, Olin J. Eggen, on several projects. In 1961, he retired from University of Wisconsin–Madison after 35 years at the institution, and was made professor emeritus.

In September 1961 he became professor at San Diego State College in California, where he remained until 1968, teaching and writing books. He worked with Frederick E. Trinklein of Racine College to write the first high school text on space science, titled Modern Space Science, which was published in 1961. Huffer published a pocket-sized dictionary of astronomy called the Astronomy Pocket Cramer in 1963. In 1967 he was co-author of An Introduction to Astronomy with previous collaborator F. E. Trinklein plus Mark Bunge of San Jose City College. On his second retirement, he was also made professor emeritus. Most of his retirement was spent at Alpine, California, but prior to his death he moved back to Madison with his wife.

In 1973, Albion College presented him a Distinguished Alumni Award. A memorial sundial at Mount Laguna Observatory was named after him in 1992.
