= VRO =

VRO or vro may refer to:

== Businesses and organizations ==
- Village Reconstruction Organization, an Indian humanitarian organization
- Aerovitro (ICAO airline code:VRO), see List of airline codes (A)
- Vehicle Registration Office, see Vehicle registration plates of the United Kingdom
- Vatreshna revolyutsionna organizatsia, Bulgarian name for the Internal Revolutionary Organization

== Places ==
- Vera C. Rubin Observatory, Chile
- Vermilion River Observatory, Illinois, US (1959–1984)
- Kawama Airport, Cuba (IATA code:VRO)

== Other uses ==
- VRO file format, container format used in DVD-VR
- Võro language, spoken in southern Estonia (ISO 639-3:vro)
- Video Replay Operator, a judge in the ISU Judging System

== See also ==
- Vr0 (rail code), see German railway signalling
- KVRO 101.1 FM; Stillwater, Oklahoma, USA
- WVRO-LP 105.3 FM; Vero Beach, Florida, USA; see List of radio stations in Florida
- VR (disambiguation)
