= Updegraff =

Updegraff may refer to:

== Places ==
- Updegraff, Iowa, an unincorporated community in Clayton County, Iowa, United States.

== People ==
from the Op den Graeff family:

- Stephen Updegraff, an American refractive surgeon
- Jonathan T. Updegraff, a U.S. Representative from Ohio
- Ed Updegraff, an American amateur golfer and urologist
- Allan Eugene Updegraff, an American-born novelist, poet, and editor
- Thomas Updegraff, an attorney and five-term Republican member of the U.S. House of Representatives from northeastern Iowa
- Alice Maxwell Lamb Updegraff, American astronomery

== Court Case ==
- Wieman v. Updegraff, a ruling by the United States Supreme Court
