= Charles Gunn =

Charles Gunn may refer to:

- Charles Gunn (actor) (1883–1918), American film actor in The Sign of the Four
- Charles Gunn (athlete) (1885–1983), British athlete and Olympic medalist
- Charles A. Gunn (1870–1945), American architect and Presbyterian missionary
- Charles Gunn (Angel), fictional character from the TV series Angel
