= Charles Wylie =

Charles Wylie may refer to:

- Charles Wylie (astronomer) (1886–1976), American astronomer
- Charles Wylie (British Army officer) (1919–2007), British army officer and mountaineer

== See also ==
- Charles Doughty-Wylie (1868–1915), English recipient of the Victoria Cross
