= Solar eclipse of June 8, 1918 =

Total eclipse

- Total eclipse
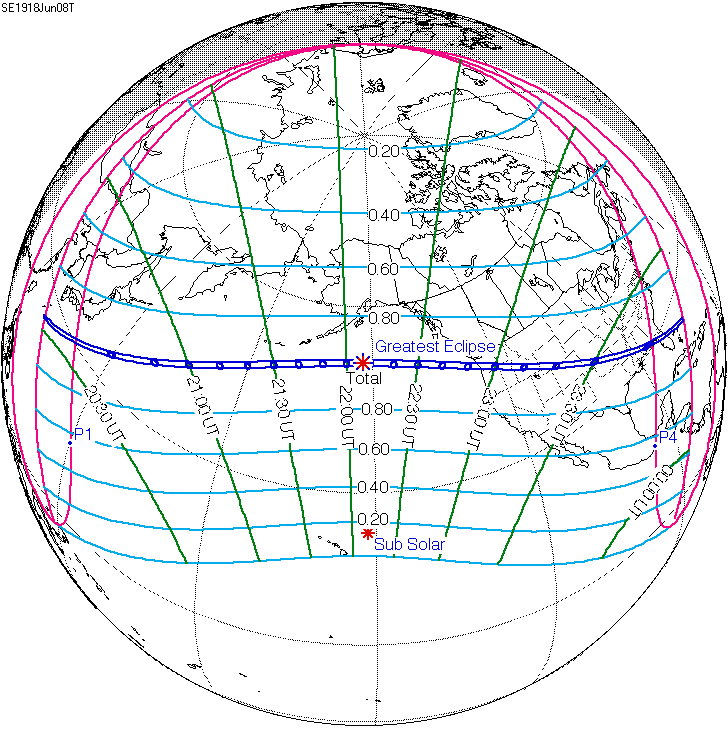
- Map
- Gamma: 0.4658
- Magnitude: 1.0292

Maximum eclipse
- Duration: 143 s (2 min 23 s)
- Coordinates: 50.9°N 152°W
- Max. width of band: 112 km (70 mi)

Times (UTC)
- Greatest eclipse: 22:07:43

References
- Saros: 126 (42 of 72)
- Catalog # (SE5000): 9324

A total solar eclipse occurred at the Moon's descending node of orbit between Saturday, June 8 and Sunday, June 9, 1918, with a magnitude of 1.0292. A solar eclipse occurs when the Moon passes between Earth and the Sun, thereby totally or partly obscuring the image of the Sun for a viewer on Earth. A total solar eclipse occurs when the Moon's apparent diameter is larger than the Sun's, blocking all direct sunlight, turning day into darkness. Totality occurs in a narrow path across Earth's surface, with the partial solar eclipse visible over a surrounding region thousands of kilometres wide. Occurring 3.7 days after perigee (on June 5, 1918, at 8:40 UTC), the Moon's apparent diameter was larger.

The eclipse was viewable across the entire contiguous United States, an event which would not occur again until the solar eclipse of August 21, 2017.

== The Path ==
Animated path

The path of totality started south of Japan, went across the Pacific Ocean, passing northern part of Kitadaitō, Okinawa and the whole Tori-shima in Izu Islands on June 9 (Sunday), and then acrossed the contiguous United States and British Bahamas (today's Bahamas) on June 8 (Saturday). The largest city to see totality was Denver, although many could theoretically see it as the size of the shadow was between 70 and 44 miles (113 and 71 km) across as it traveled across America. The longest duration of totality was in the Pacific at a point south of Alaska. The path of the eclipse finished near Bermuda.

Besides the path where a total solar eclipse was visible, a partial solar eclipse was visible in the eastern part of East Asia, northern part of Northern Europe, eastern part of Micronesia, Hawaii Islands, northeastern Russian Empire, the entire North America except the Lesser Antilles, and the northwestern tip of South America.

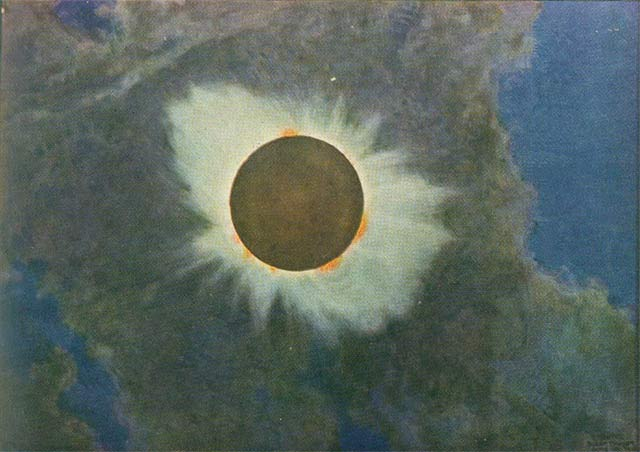
1918 Solar eclipse painting by Howard Russell Butler

== U.S. Observation team ==
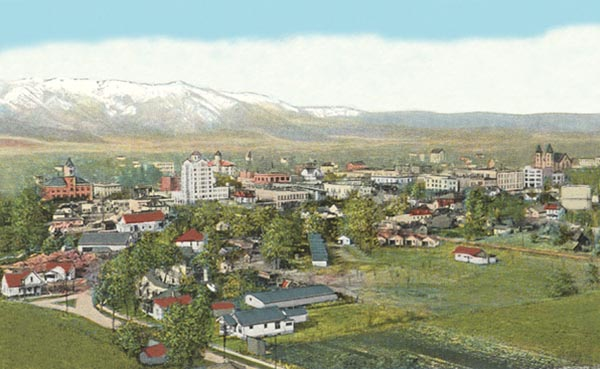
Aerial view of Baker City, Oregon, in 1918.

The path of the eclipse clipped Washington state, and then moved across the whole of Oregon through the rest of the country, exiting over Florida. The U.S. Naval Observatory (USNO) obtained a special grant of $3,500 from Congress for a team to observe the eclipse in Baker City, Oregon. The team had been making preparations since the year before, and John C. Hammond led the first members to Baker City on April 11. The location was important, as it influenced the probability of cloud cover and the duration and angle of the sun during the eclipse. The team included Samuel Alfred Mitchell as its expert on eclipses, and Howard Russell Butler, an artist and physicist. In a time before reliable colour photography, Butler's role was to paint the eclipse at totality after observing it for 112.1 seconds. He noted later that he used a system of taking notes of the colours using skills he had learned for transient effects.

Joel Stebbins and Jakob Kunz from the University of Illinois Observatory made the first photoelectric photometric observations of the solar corona from their observing site near Rock Springs, Wyoming

=== Observation ===
As the total eclipse approached, the team watched as clouds obscured the Sun. The clouds did clear, but during their most important observations the Sun was covered by a thin cloud; the Sun was completely visible five minutes later. This was not unusual, as cloudy conditions were reported across the country, where the eclipse was also observed from the Yerkes Observatory, Lick Observatory, and Mount Wilson Observatory.

Following the 1915 prediction of Albert Einstein's General theory of relativity that light would be deflected when passing near a massive object such as the Sun, the USNO expedition attempted to validate Einstein's prediction by measuring the position of stars near the Sun. The cloud cover during totality obscured observations of stars, though, preventing this test of the validity of general relativity from being completed until the solar eclipse of May 29, 1919.

== Eclipse details ==
Shown below are two tables displaying details about this particular solar eclipse. The first table outlines times at which the Moon's penumbra or umbra attains the specific parameter, and the second table describes various other parameters pertaining to this eclipse.

June 8, 1918 Solar Eclipse Times
Event	Time (UTC)
First Penumbral External Contact	1918 June 8 at 19:29:10.1 UTC
First Umbral External Contact	1918 June 8 at 20:31:51.8 UTC
First Central Line	1918 June 8 at 20:32:20.5 UTC
First Umbral Internal Contact	1918 June 8 at 20:32:49.1 UTC
Ecliptic Conjunction	1918 June 8 at 22:02:46.3 UTC
Greatest Duration	1918 June 8 at 22:05:43.3 UTC
Equatorial Conjunction	1918 June 8 at 22:07:34.5 UTC
Greatest Eclipse	1918 June 8 at 22:07:43.2 UTC
Last Umbral Internal Contact	1918 June 8 at 23:42:40.5 UTC
Last Central Line	1918 June 8 at 23:43:06.6 UTC
Last Umbral External Contact	1918 June 8 at 23:43:32.6 UTC
Last Penumbral External Contact	1918 June 9 at 00:46:21.9 UTC

June 8, 1918 Solar Eclipse Parameters
Parameter	Value
Eclipse Magnitude	1.02920
Eclipse Obscuration	1.05925
Gamma	0.46582
Sun Right Ascension	05h04m40.0s
Sun Declination	+22°50'23.8"
Sun Semi-Diameter	15'45.3"
Sun Equatorial Horizontal Parallax	08.7"
Moon Right Ascension	05h04m40.4s
Moon Declination	+23°17'39.1"
Moon Semi-Diameter	15'59.0"
Moon Equatorial Horizontal Parallax	0°58'39.4"
ΔT	20.5 s

== Eclipse season ==
This eclipse is part of an eclipse season, a period, roughly every six months, when eclipses occur. Only two (or occasionally three) eclipse seasons occur each year, and each season lasts about 35 days and repeats just short of six months (173 days) later; thus two full eclipse seasons always occur each year. Either two or three eclipses happen each eclipse season. In the sequence below, each eclipse is separated by a fortnight.

Eclipse season of June 1918
June 8 Descending node (new moon)	June 24 Ascending node (full moon)
Total solar eclipse Solar Saros 126	Partial lunar eclipse Lunar Saros 138

== Related eclipses ==
=== Eclipses in 1918 ===
- A total solar eclipse on June 8.
- A partial lunar eclipse on June 24.
- An annular solar eclipse on December 3.
- A penumbral lunar eclipse on December 17.

=== Metonic ===
- Preceded by: Solar eclipse of August 21, 1914
- Followed by: Solar eclipse of March 28, 1922

=== Tzolkinex ===
- Preceded by: Solar eclipse of April 28, 1911
- Followed by: Solar eclipse of July 20, 1925

=== Half-Saros ===
- Preceded by: Lunar eclipse of June 4, 1909
- Followed by: Lunar eclipse of June 15, 1927

=== Tritos ===
- Preceded by: Solar eclipse of July 10, 1907
- Followed by: Solar eclipse of May 9, 1929

=== Solar Saros 126 ===
- Preceded by: Solar eclipse of May 28, 1900
- Followed by: Solar eclipse of June 19, 1936

=== Inex ===
- Preceded by: Solar eclipse of June 28, 1889
- Followed by: Solar eclipse of May 20, 1947

=== Triad ===
- Preceded by: Solar eclipse of August 7, 1831
- Followed by: Solar eclipse of April 8, 2005

=== Solar eclipses of 1916–1920 ===
This eclipse is a member of a semester series. An eclipse in a semester series of solar eclipses repeats approximately every 177 days and 4 hours (a semester) at alternating nodes of the Moon's orbit.

The solar eclipses on February 3, 1916 (total), July 30, 1916 (annular), January 23, 1917 (partial), and July 19, 1917 (partial) occur in the previous lunar year eclipse set.

Solar eclipse series sets from 1916 to 1920
Ascending node			Descending node		
Saros	Map	Gamma	Saros	Map	Gamma
111	December 24, 1916 Partial	−1.5321	116	June 19, 1917 Partial	1.2857
121	December 14, 1917 Annular	−0.9157	126	June 8, 1918 Total	0.4658
131	December 3, 1918 Annular	−0.2387	136 Totality in Príncipe	May 29, 1919 Total	−0.2955
141	November 22, 1919 Annular	0.4549	146	May 18, 1920 Partial	−1.0239
151	November 10, 1920 Partial	1.1287			

=== Saros 126 ===
This eclipse is a part of Saros series 126, repeating every 18 years, 11 days, and containing 72 events. The series started with a partial solar eclipse on March 10, 1179. It contains annular eclipses from June 4, 1323 through April 4, 1810; hybrid eclipses from April 14, 1828 through May 6, 1864; and total eclipses from May 17, 1882 through August 23, 2044. The series ends at member 72 as a partial eclipse on May 3, 2459. Its eclipses are tabulated in three columns; every third eclipse in the same column is one exeligmos apart, so they all cast shadows over approximately the same parts of the Earth.

The longest duration of annularity was produced by member 11 at 6 minutes, 30 seconds on June 26, 1359, and the longest duration of totality was produced by member 45 at 2 minutes, 36 seconds on July 10, 1972. All eclipses in this series occur at the Moon’s descending node of orbit.

Series members 36–57 occur between 1801 and 2200:
36	37	38
April 4, 1810	April 14, 1828	April 25, 1846
39	40	41
May 6, 1864	May 17, 1882	May 28, 1900
42	43	44
June 8, 1918	June 19, 1936	June 30, 1954
45	46	47
July 10, 1972	July 22, 1990	August 1, 2008
48	49	50
August 12, 2026	August 23, 2044	September 3, 2062
51	52	53
September 13, 2080	September 25, 2098	October 6, 2116
54	55	56
October 17, 2134	October 28, 2152	November 8, 2170
57
November 18, 2188

=== Metonic series ===
The metonic series repeats eclipses every 19 years (6939.69 days), lasting about 5 cycles. Eclipses occur in nearly the same calendar date. In addition, the octon subseries repeats 1/5 of that or every 3.8 years (1387.94 days). All eclipses in this table occur at the Moon's descending node.

22 eclipse events between March 27, 1884 and August 20, 1971
March 27–29	January 14	November 1–2	August 20–21	June 8
108	110	112	114	116
March 27, 1884			August 20, 1895	June 8, 1899
118	120	122	124	126
March 29, 1903	January 14, 1907	November 2, 1910	August 21, 1914	June 8, 1918
128	130	132	134	136
March 28, 1922	January 14, 1926	November 1, 1929	August 21, 1933	June 8, 1937
138	140	142	144	146
March 27, 1941	January 14, 1945	November 1, 1948	August 20, 1952	June 8, 1956
148	150	152	154	
March 27, 1960	January 14, 1964	November 2, 1967	August 20, 1971	

=== Tritos series ===
This eclipse is a part of a tritos cycle, repeating at alternating nodes every 135 synodic months (≈ 3986.63 days, or 11 years minus 1 month). Their appearance and longitude are irregular due to a lack of synchronization with the anomalistic month (period of perigee), but groupings of 3 tritos cycles (≈ 33 years minus 3 months) come close (≈ 434.044 anomalistic months), so eclipses are similar in these groupings.

Series members between 1801 and 2200
April 14, 1809 (Saros 116)	March 14, 1820 (Saros 117)	February 12, 1831 (Saros 118)	January 11, 1842 (Saros 119)	December 11, 1852 (Saros 120)
November 11, 1863 (Saros 121)	October 10, 1874 (Saros 122)	September 8, 1885 (Saros 123)	August 9, 1896 (Saros 124)	July 10, 1907 (Saros 125)
June 8, 1918 (Saros 126)	May 9, 1929 (Saros 127)	April 7, 1940 (Saros 128)	March 7, 1951 (Saros 129)	February 5, 1962 (Saros 130)
January 4, 1973 (Saros 131)	December 4, 1983 (Saros 132)	November 3, 1994 (Saros 133)	October 3, 2005 (Saros 134)	September 1, 2016 (Saros 135)
August 2, 2027 (Saros 136)	July 2, 2038 (Saros 137)	May 31, 2049 (Saros 138)	April 30, 2060 (Saros 139)	March 31, 2071 (Saros 140)
February 27, 2082 (Saros 141)	January 27, 2093 (Saros 142)	December 29, 2103 (Saros 143)	November 27, 2114 (Saros 144)	October 26, 2125 (Saros 145)
September 26, 2136 (Saros 146)	August 26, 2147 (Saros 147)	July 25, 2158 (Saros 148)	June 25, 2169 (Saros 149)	May 24, 2180 (Saros 150)
April 23, 2191 (Saros 151)

=== Inex series ===
This eclipse is a part of the long period inex cycle, repeating at alternating nodes, every 358 synodic months (≈ 10,571.95 days, or 29 years minus 20 days). Their appearance and longitude are irregular due to a lack of synchronization with the anomalistic month (period of perigee). However, groupings of 3 inex cycles (≈ 87 years minus 2 months) comes close (≈ 1,151.02 anomalistic months), so eclipses are similar in these groupings.

Series members between 1801 and 2200
August 28, 1802 (Saros 122)	August 7, 1831 (Saros 123)	July 18, 1860 (Saros 124)
June 28, 1889 (Saros 125)	June 8, 1918 (Saros 126)	May 20, 1947 (Saros 127)
April 29, 1976 (Saros 128)	April 8, 2005 (Saros 129)	March 20, 2034 (Saros 130)
February 28, 2063 (Saros 131)	February 7, 2092 (Saros 132)	January 19, 2121 (Saros 133)
December 30, 2149 (Saros 134)	December 9, 2178 (Saros 135)	
