= NGC 5490 =

Radio galaxy in the constellation Boötes

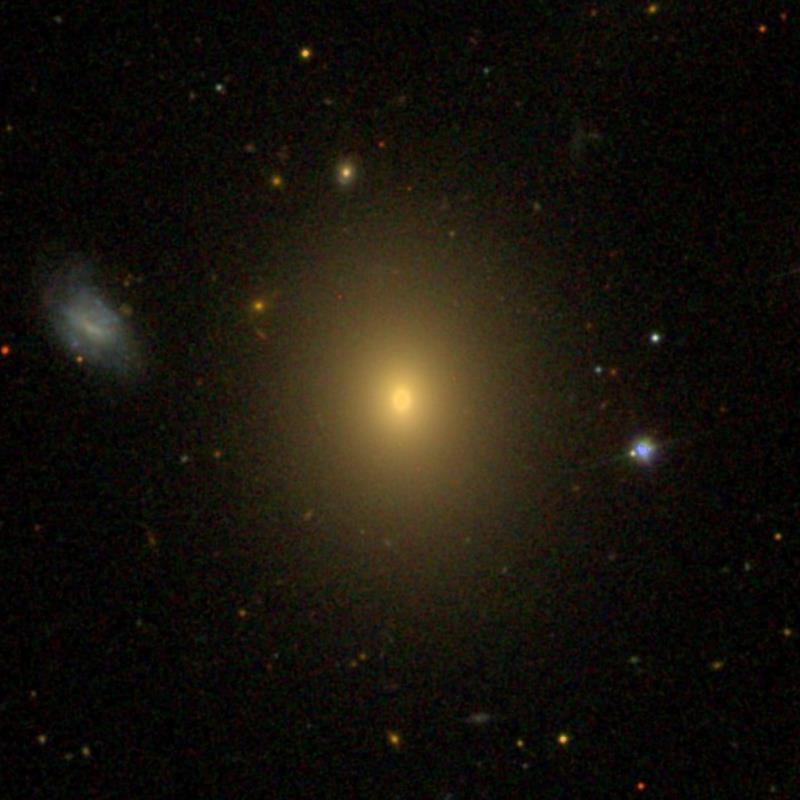
- SDSS image of NGC 5490

Observation data (J2000 epoch)
- Constellation: Boötes
- Right ascension: 14^{h} 09^{m} 57.330^{s}
- Declination: +17° 32′ 43.53″
- Redshift: 0.016693
- Heliocentric radial velocity: 4838 ± 14 km/s
- Distance: 225.63 ± 0.29 Mly (69.18 ± 0.09 Mpc)
- Group or cluster: NGC 5490 Group (LGG 376)
- Apparent magnitude (V): 12.9

Characteristics
- Type: E
- Size: ~188,400 ly (57.75 kpc) (estimated)
- Apparent size (V): 1.443′ × 1.126′
- Notable features: See also Gra 1408+17

Other designations
- 2MASX J14095733+1732435, 4C 17.57, CGCG 103.095, GC 3798, H III-32, h 1752, LEDA 50558, LGG 376-001, MITG J1409+1732, MCG+03-36-065, MRC 1407+177, OHIO Q 112, PGC 50558, PKS 1407+17, UGC 9058, UT 1407+178, UZC J140957.3+173244, VRO 17.14.01, Z 103-95, Z 1407.6+1747

NGC 5490 is a large elliptical galaxy located in the constellation of Boötes. Its velocity relative to the cosmic microwave background is 5,075 ± 22 km/s, which corresponds to a Hubble distance of 244.1 ± 17.1 Mly (74.85 ± 5.25 Mpc). In addition, 13 non-redshift measurements gives a distance of 269.98 ± 15.01 Mly (82.777 ± 4.603 Mpc). NGC 5490 was discovered by the German-British astronomer William Herschel on 14 March 1784.

== Supernovae ==
Two supernovae have been observed in NGC 5490:

- SN 1997cn (Type Ia, mag. 15.8) was discovered by the BAO Supernova Survey on 14 May 1997.
- SN 2015bo (Type Ia, mag. 18.4) was discovered by the Catalina Real-time Transient Survey on 14 February 2015.

== Supermassive Black Hole ==
According to a study published in 2009 and based on the internal velocity of the galaxy measured by the Hubble Space Telescope, the mass of the supermassive black hole at the center of NGC 5490 is between 260 million and 1.9 billion M_{☉}.

== GRA B1408+17 ==
According to the SIMBAD database, NGC 5490 is a radio galaxy. GRA B1408+17 is a radio-source in NGC 5490 located at the coordinates RA 14^{h} 10^{m} 24^{s}, DEC +17° 32′ 00″.

== NGC 5490 Group ==
According to A.M. Garcia, NGC 5490 is the main galaxy in a group that bears its name. The NGC 5490 group (also known as LGG 376) has three other members: IC 982, IC 984, and UGC 9078.
