= Jakob Kunz =

American physicist

Jakob Kunz (November 3, 1874 – July 18, 1938) was an American physicist who pioneered the development and application of photoelectric cells. Born in Brittnau, Switzerland, he earned his bachelor's degree in 1897 and his Ph.D. in 1902 from the Eidgenossisches Polytechnikum in Zurich, and was active in the Baháʼí Faith from 1921.

== Physics department ==
Kunz arrived at the University of Illinois in 1909 as a theoretical physicist. He taught most of the graduate courses and supervised half of the Ph. Ds up to 1929. Larazus notes that “He was clearly the intellectual leader of the department.” One of his students was E. Frances Seiler who became the first woman to earn a Ph.D. in physics at Illinois for her thesis on the color-sensitivity of photoelectric cells. Kunz also wrote papers on and gave public lectures on relativity.

== Photoelectric cells and astronomical photometry ==
Kunz made significant contributions to construction of photoelectric cells improving on the methods introduced by Elster and Geitel. During the fall of 1911, he began a collaboration and friendship with the University of Illinois Observatory director Joel Stebbins that would revolutionize astronomical photometry. Kunz's photoelectric cells were many times more sensitive that what was available commercially and therefore able to detect faint star light. Kunz's cells would be used at half a dozen observatories all across the nation including Yerkes Observatory, Lick Observatory, and Washburn Observatory. Kunz also accompanied Stebbins and four solar eclipse expeditions beginning with the Solar eclipse of June 8, 1918 to measure the total light of the solar corona with the photoelectric photometer. The collaboration between Stebbins and Kunz continued until Kunz's death in 1938.

Kunz also collaborated with electrical engineering professor Joseph Tykociński-Tykociner to use a photoelectric cell to photograph sound and reproduce it electronically. When Tykociner demonstrates the first sound-on-film motion picture recordings in 1921 in Urbana, the projector had a Kunz cell at its heart.

== Family ==
Jakob Kunz was the son of Jakob and Anna Marie Weber Kunz. He was married to Anna Bolliger about 1913 and had two daughters Anna Marie and Margaret. Stebbins remembers Kunz as “the proverbial simplicity of a true scientist; he was liberal in politics and religions, and was always an enthusiastic worker for social justice.”

In the Urbana area Kunz and his wife were active in the Baháʼí Faith. In 1922 he spoke on the subject of the harmony of science and religion, a subject he and Anna had spoken with ʻAbdu'l-Bahá on during their pilgrimage the year before. In 1919 they had co-signed a letter to ʻAbdu'l-Bahá following the break in communication with the Baháʼís during World War I. They spent about a year abroad. The Kunz daughters Annamarie and Margaret lead a class of a youth session of Louhelen Baháʼí School in the summer of 1937. The Kunz family would continue to speak at and sometimes host events of the religion in the coming years. Following Kunz' death, Anna moved to Switzerland to help spread the religion there where she died in August, 1973 Their daughter Anna Marie (Annamarie) Honnold gave some talks, and authored a well-known collection of stories about ʻAbdu'l-Bahá. Their other daughter Margaret married David Ruhe and long served as an assistant to Ruhiyyih Khanum in her various travels.

== See also ==
- University of Illinois Observatory
