= 2301 Whitford =

Background asteroid

Discovery
- Discovered by: Indiana University (Indiana Asteroid Program)
- Discovery site: Goethe Link Obs.
- Discovery date: 20 November 1965

Designations
- Named after: Albert Whitford (American astronomer)
- Alternative designations: 1965 WJ · 1931 TR_{2} 1944 BB · 1955 BC; 1967 GK_{1} · 1974 MD; 1976 UA_{4}
- Minor planet category: main-belt · (outer) background

Orbital characteristics
- Epoch 23 March 2018 (JD 2458200.5)
- Uncertainty parameter 0
- Observation arc: 86.30 yr (31,522 d)
- Aphelion: 3.8557 AU
- Perihelion: 2.5071 AU
- Semi-major axis: 3.1814 AU
- Eccentricity: 0.2119
- Orbital period (sidereal): 5.67 yr (2,073 d)
- Mean anomaly: 100.82°
- Mean motion: 0° 10^{m} 25.32^{s} / day
- Inclination: 11.653°
- Longitude of ascending node: 78.984°
- Argument of perihelion: 8.1290°

Physical characteristics
- Mean diameter: 16.56 km (calculated); 17.40±3.72 km 19.47±1.37 km
- Synodic rotation period: 14.275±0.0049 h 27.1±0.1 h (poor) (Note: Aznar (2011) web: rotation period 27.1±0.1 hours with a brightness amplitude of 1.0±0.05 mag. Observation from November 2010. Quality code of 1. Summary figures at the LCDB)
- Geometric albedo: 0.20 (assumed); 0.223±0.033; 0.240±0.282
- Spectral type: L · S (SDSS-MFB) (Note: Search for Unusual Spectroscopic Candidates Among 40313 minor planets from the 3rd Release of the Sloan Digital Sky Survey Moving Object Catalog (publication). SDSS-MFB (Masi Foglia Binzel) taxonomy (catalog).)
- Absolute magnitude (H): 10.80 · 10.815±0.003 (R) · 10.97 · 11.0 · 11.27 · 11.52±0.29

2301 Whitford, provisional designation 1965 WJ, is a background asteroid from the outer regions of the asteroid belt, approximately 17 kilometers (11 miles) in diameter. It was discovered on 20 November 1965, by astronomers of the Indiana Asteroid Program at Goethe Link Observatory in the United States. The asteroid was named for American physicist and astronomer Albert Whitford. The uncommon L-type asteroid has a rotation period of 14.3 hours.

== Orbit and classification ==
Whitford is a non-family asteroid from the main belt's background population. It orbits the Sun in the outer main-belt at a distance of 2.5–3.9 AU once every 5 years and 8 months (2,073 days; semi-major axis of 3.18 AU). Its orbit has an eccentricity of 0.21 and an inclination of 12° with respect to the ecliptic.

The asteroid was first observed as 1931 TR_{2} at Lowell Observatory in October 1931. The body's observation arc begins ten years prior to its official discovery observation with its observation as 1955 BC at Goethe Link Observatory in January 1955.

== Physical characteristics ==
Whitford has been characterized as an uncommon L-type asteroid by Pan-STARRS' photometric survey. It is also characterized as a common S-type asteroid in the SDSS-MFB (Masi Foglia Binzel) taxonomy.

=== Rotation period ===
In April 2012, a rotational lightcurve of Whitford was obtained from photometric observations in the R-band by astronomers at the Palomar Transient Factory in California. Lightcurve analysis gave a rotation period of 14.275 hours with a brightness amplitude of 0.35 magnitude (U=2), superseding a previous measurement of 27.1 hours (U=1).

=== Diameter and albedo ===
According to the surveys carried out by the Japanese Akari satellite and the NEOWISE mission of NASA's Wide-field Infrared Survey Explorer, Whitford measures between 17.40 and 19.47 kilometers in diameter and its surface has an albedo between 0.223 and 0.240.

The Collaborative Asteroid Lightcurve Link assumes a standard albedo for stony asteroids of 0.20 and calculates a diameter of 16.56 kilometers based on an absolute magnitude of 11.27.

== Naming ==
This minor planet was named after American physicist and astronomer Albert Whitford (1905–2002), who was a pioneer in photoelectric photometry. Whitford was also a director at the Washburn and Lick observatories, as well as a former president of the American Astronomical Society. The official naming citation was published by the Minor Planet Center on 20 December 1983 (M.P.C. 8403).
