= Pine Bluff, Wisconsin =

- Unincorporated community
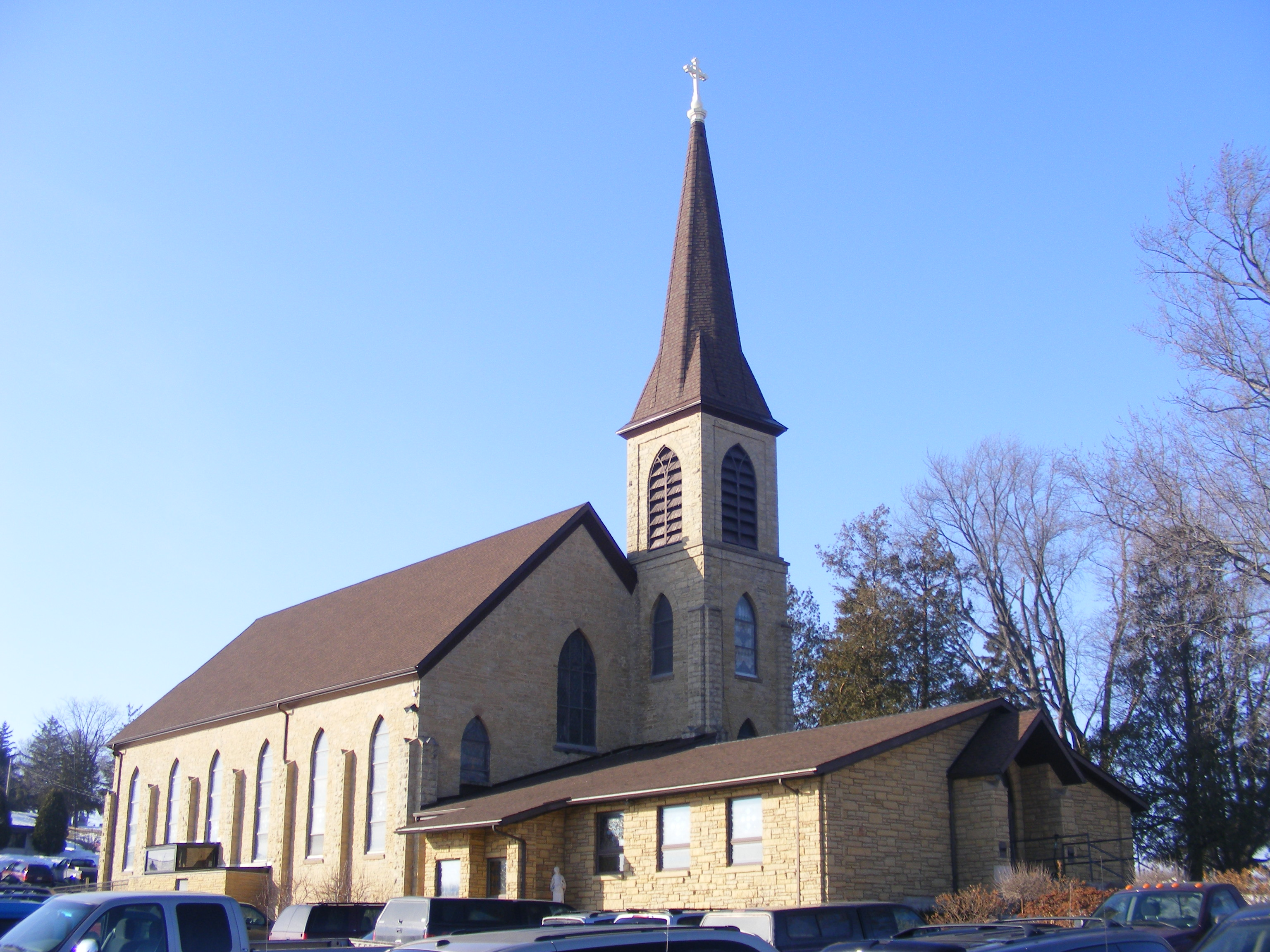
- St. Mary's Catholic Church

- Location within Wisconsin Location within the United States
- Coordinates: 43°03′39″N 89°39′20″W
- Country: United States
- State: Wisconsin
- County: Dane County
- Town: Cross Plains
- Elevation: 997 ft (304 m)
- Time zone: UTC-6 (Central (CST))
  - Summer (DST): UTC-5 (CDT)
- Area code: 608
- GNIS feature ID: 1571419

Pine Bluff is an unincorporated community located in the town of Cross Plains, Dane County, Wisconsin, United States.

It is the site of the observatory of the University of Wisconsin.
