= Edith Summers Kelley =

Edith Summers Kelley (April 28, 1884 – June 9, 1956) was a Canadian-born author who lived and worked in the United States, and is best known for her 1923 novel Weeds, set in the hills of Kentucky.

Kelley was born in Toronto, Ontario, Canada, to Scottish immigrants and graduated from the University of Toronto before moving to Greenwich Village where she met Upton Sinclair, who offered her a job at Helicon Home Colony. At the colony she met Sinclair Lewis. They were engaged for two years, but she married his roommate, a poet and novelist named Allan Updegraff. Kelley taught night school to support Updegraff and their two children. After they divorced, she became involved with Fred Kelley, an artist, moved around the country with him and had another child.

Weeds was conceived while she and Fred Kelley lived on a tobacco farm in Scott County, Kentucky. It had some positive reviews but no commercial success; a second novel, The Devil's Hand, written while she and Kelley lived in Imperial Valley, California, was left unfinished, and was not printed until 1974.
