= Astronomical Observatory (University of Illinois Urbana-Champaign) =

Observatory in Urbana, Illinois, U.S.

- University of Illinois Astronomical Observatory
- U.S. National Register of Historic Places
- U.S. National Historic Landmark
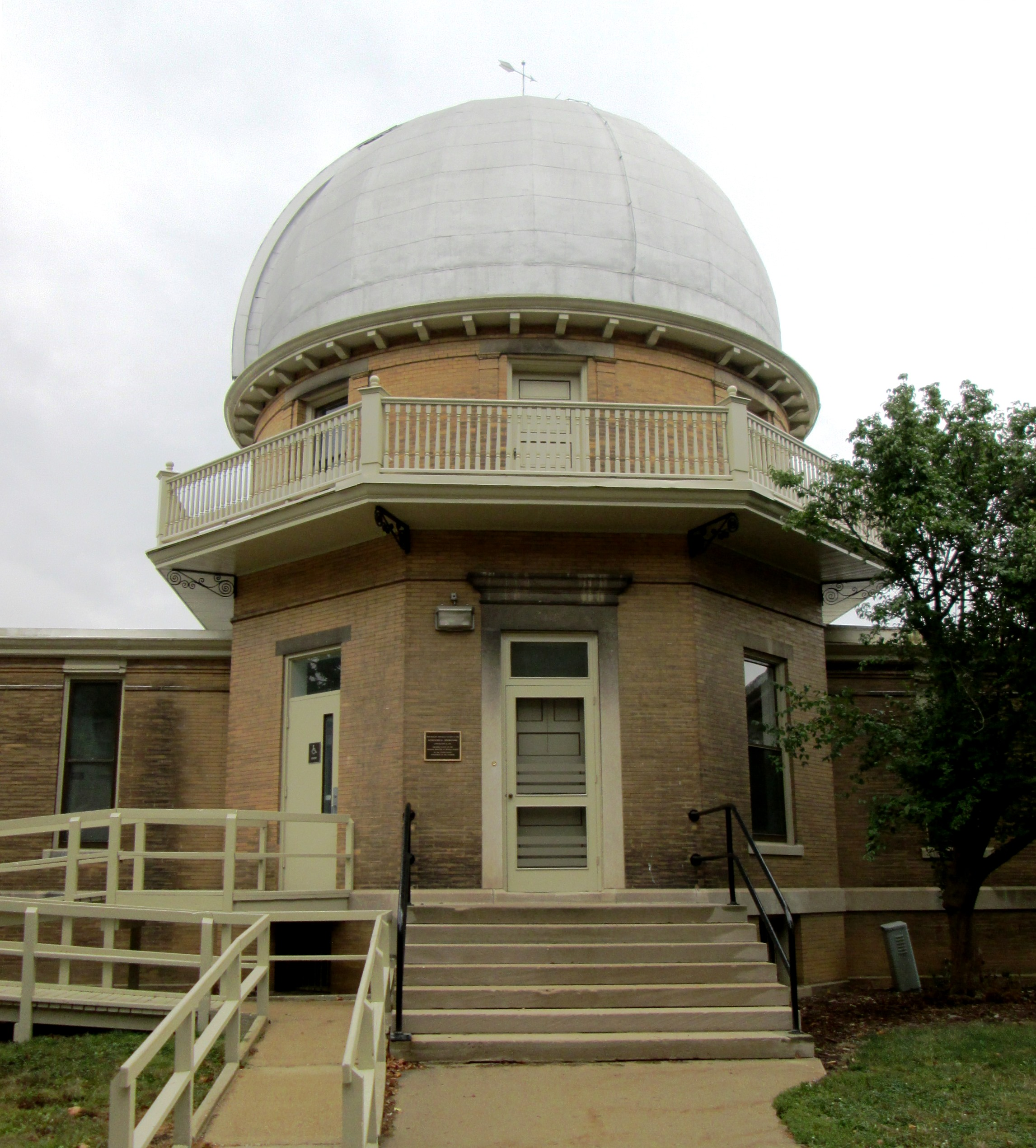
- (2013)

- Location within Illinois Location within the United States
- Location: 901 S. Mathews Ave. Urbana, Illinois
- Coordinates: 40°6′18.9″N 88°13′34.1″W
- Built: 1896
- Architect: Charles A. Gunn
- Architectural style: Observatory, Colonial Revival
- NRHP reference No.: 86003155

Significant dates
- Added to NRHP: November 6, 1986
- Designated NHL: December 20, 1989

The University of Illinois Astronomical Observatory, located at 901 S. Mathews Avenue in Urbana, Illinois, on the campus of the University of Illinois Urbana–Champaign, was built in 1896, and was designed by Charles A. Gunn. It was listed on the National Register of Historic Places on November 6, 1986, and on December 20, 1989, was designated a National Historic Landmark.

Though none of the astronomical instruments are being used for professional research today, the observatory still contains a 12" Brashear refractor. The observatory played a key role in the development of astronomy as it was home to a key innovation in the area of astronomical photometry. The facility has been directed by such noted scientists as Joel Stebbins and Robert Horace Baker.

Erected at the behest of the Illinois General Assembly, the University of Illinois Observatory became important in the development of astronomy due, in large part, to pioneering research by Dr. Stebbins, from 1907 to 1922. Joel Stebbins left the University of Illinois in 1922 but left behind a legacy of discovery that helped alter the face of modern astronomy. The building served the University of Illinois astronomy department from its opening until 1979, when the department moved into a new, larger building to house its growing staff.

== History ==
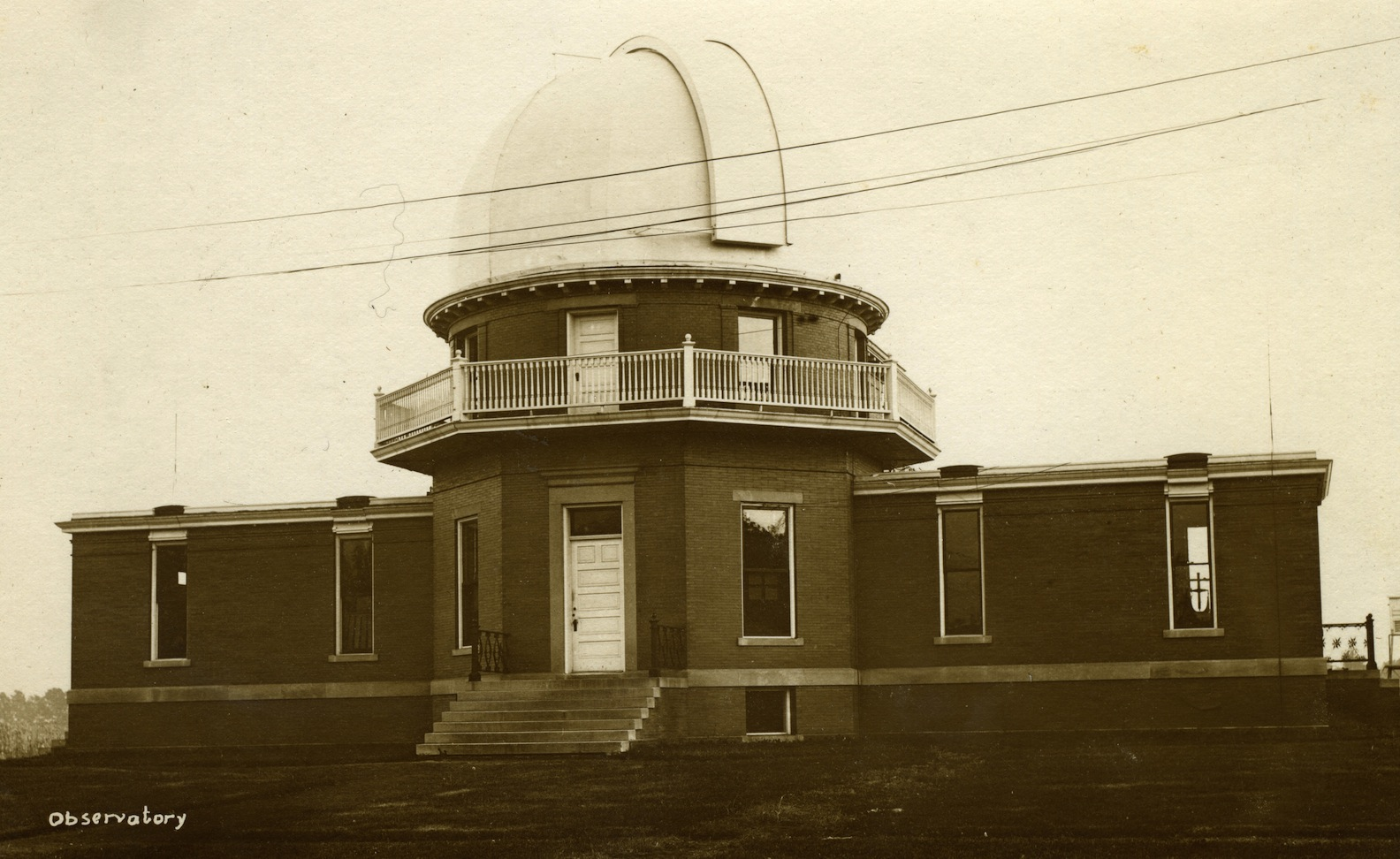
The Observatory in 1905

=== Early history ===
Astronomy classes at the University of Illinois date to its earliest days. The first courses focused on measurement of the night sky and was taken by civil engineering students to sharpen their surveying skills. A small observatory consisting of a 4-inch refractor and a small transit telescope was constructed by 1872. The astronomy courses were typically taught by the mathematics department and by the early 1890s, several mathematics instructors wanted to do more with astronomy. An expanded astronomy curriculum would require a new larger facility.

The Illinois state legislature voted in 1895 to fund a new teaching observatory at the University of Illinois, providing $15,000 for construction. The site chosen was a grass knoll between Matthews Avenue and Burrill Avenue, just north of the Morrow Plots, a National Historic Landmark that is the nation's oldest experimental field. Contracts were extended to Charles A. Gunn, the architect and an instructor on campus, and Bevis and Company in Urbana as the general contractor with construction beginning in April 1896. The building was completed by August at a total cost of $6,800. The principle telescope was installed in November and the final telescope was in place by February 1897.

The first director of the observatory was George W. Myers. Myers was a Champaign county native who graduated from the university in 1888. He remained as a mathematics instructor also teaching the spring Descriptive Astronomy course. In preparation for the directorship he spent two years in Munich earning his Ph.D. in astronomy. In his first year as director, G.W. Myers announced the discovery of the source of the variability in the star Beta Lyrae at the opening conference for Yerkes Observatory. He served as director from 1897 until 1900 when he left for the University of Chicago. W.C. Brenke, an astronomy instructor, served as acting director until a new director was hired in 1903.

=== Stebbins' research ===
Before 1907, all magnitude measurements for stars were obtained through visual comparison of relative brightness, a process that was slow and inexact. Later photographic methods would use starlight to make a representation on a photographic plate. Regardless, neither method was adequate for quantitative measurements. The drawback of previous methods of measuring stellar magnitude made the use of electricity for empirically gathering astronomical data revolutionary for the science of astronomy. Joel Stebbins' pioneering research for astronomical photometry took place at the observatory.

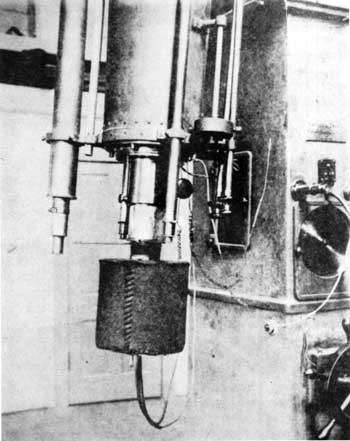
The selenium cell photometer mounted on the refractor telescope in 1910

Stebbins arrived as director of the University of Illinois Observatory after he completed his Ph.D. at the University of California, Berkeley in 1903. Once Stebbins arrived fresh from his dissertation completed at Lick Observatory, he began a two-year study of the brightness of 107 binary stars using a Pickering visual photometer. The research, with the assistance of his wife, May Stebbins, investigated the relative brightness on binary stars using visual techniques. In a 1957 speech at the American Astronomical Society, Stebbins recalled the events which led to the electric cells:

She [May Stebbins] wrote down the numbers as the observer called them, but after some nights of recording a hundred readings just to get one magnitude, she said it was pretty slow business. I responded that someday we would do all this by electricity. That was a fatal remark. Thereafter she would often prod me with the question, "When are you going to change to electricity?" It happened that within two or three months, the Department of Physics gave an open house, and one of the exhibits was in [the] charge of a young instructor, F.C. Brown. He showed how, when he turned on a lamp to illuminate a selenium cell, a bell would ring, when the lamp was off, the bell would stop. Here was the idea: Why not turn on a star to a cell on a telescope and measure a current?

Stebbins and Fay C. Brown soon became friends and in time, they had a selenium cell positioned on the 12-inch (300 mm) telescope at the observatory. In the summer of 1907, after several attempts, the two achieved a light curve for Earth's moon and measured the moon's brightness during a lunar eclipse. This marked the first time in America that electricity was used to measure astronomical brightness. Later Stebbins went further, discovering that by cooling the cell to zero degrees Fahrenheit he would double the cell sensitivity and diminish irregularities in the circuit tenfold, still further, by reducing the size of the cell the irregularities were reduced more. The pair went on to detect stellar intensity and activity that were previously unrecorded. In 1909 their observations of Algol detected for the first time the second minimum as well as limb brightening. The coming of Comet Halley in 1910 allowed Stebbins, in May, to use his selenium photometer to study the comet. Two years later Stebbins used the photometer and discovered four stars to be eclipsing binary stars: Beta Aurigae, Spica, Alpha Coronae Borealis and Delta Orionis.

Although the selenium cell photometer was proving successful, it was difficult to use and not very sensitive. Illinois physics professor Jakob Kunz suggested that Stebbins try a photoelectric cell. Kunz had been experimenting on an improved photoelectric cell which was alkali based. Kunz's cell was the predecessor of the modern day "electric eye." Stebbins left for a sabbatical in Europe in fall of 1912. While he was gone, Kunz and another Illinois physicist, W.F. Schulz, successfully tested a photoelectric cell photometer at the observatory.

Upon his return from sabbatical in August 1913, Stebbins ended his pioneering work with the selenium cell and began working with Kunz on the new photometer.

In 1915, Stebbins' object of study became the star involved in Myers' first big discovery at the observatory, Beta Lyrae. He thus began an aggressive research program that produced a series of papers in the Astrophysical Journal on eclipsing binaries Lambda Tauri, Algol, 1H Cassiopeiae (HR 8926), ellipsoidal variables π5 Orionis, and b Persei, and Nova Aquilae (V603 Aquilae) in 1918. Stebbins and Kunz also travelled to Wyoming to study the Solar eclipse of June 8, 1918. Dr. Elmer Dershem joined the observatory staff in 1917 and rebuilt the photometer in the summer of 1919. By 1922, Charles Wylie completed the first Illinois astronomy doctorate for his photoelectric studies of the Cepheid Η Aquilae, and Sigma Aquilae noting its variations due to tidal distortions.

In 1913, Stebbins was awarded the Rumford Prize of the American Academy of Arts and Science, and in 1915 the Henry Draper Medal of the National Academy of Sciences. The research was also supported by grants from the Draper fund of the National Academy of Sciences and the Rumford Fund of the American Academy of Arts and Sciences. Stebbins served as an officer of the American Astronomical Society and was one of the American delegates in 1918 to attend the organizational meeting of the International Astronomical Union in Brussels.

Stebbins left the University of Illinois in 1922 for the Washburn Observatory in Wisconsin and Dr. Robert H. Baker took over as the new Director of the University of Illinois Observatory. However, discovery and science did continue at the university's observatory.

=== Robert Baker, third director ===
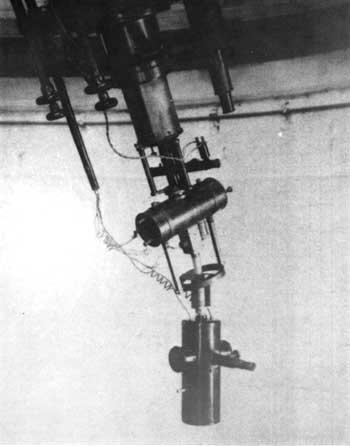
Stebbins' photoelectric photometer mounted on the 12-inch (300 mm) refractor in 1913.

When Robert Baker arrived he continued a photoelectric photometry program focusing on variable stars. He continued to use the 12-inch refractor until 1927 when a new photometer was constructed and attached to the 30-inch reflector telescope in the observatory annex. He supervised two graduate students who worked on this equipment in the early 1930s. On May 27, 1933, the star Arcturus provided light which fell onto a photo cell in the observatory's annex and sent a signal to open the Chicago World's Fair.

The Great Depression was soon in full swing and the department budget fell from $1000 to $200. It was during this time that Dr. Baker authored a number of books. In 1930, he authored the textbook Astronomy, followed in 1932 by The Universe Unfolding, and his revision of Simon Newcomb's Astronomy for Everyone. In 1934 Baker described an imaginary trip to the moon in When the Stars Come Out. His second textbook, An Introduction to Astronomy also appeared in 1934. Introducing the Constellation was published in 1937 and, with the help of Howard Zim in 1951, Stars: A Guide to the Heavens. His textbooks were used across the country for undergraduate astronomy courses and praised as classics.

After two sabbaticals to Harvard, Baker's interest moved from photometry to the Milky Way. In 1939 the 30-inch reflector was replaced with a Ross photographic telescope and in the years 1939 through 1951, Baker used the observatory's photographic telescope to help count the stars in the Milky Way and determine their distribution as part of Harvard University's Star Counting Circuit. This would be the primary research until Baker's retirement in 1951. The 12-inch refractor was only used for instruction, public open houses and for visiting school groups.

=== Modern department ===
The university increased the size of the department and hired Dr. George C. McVittie as the next director. After his arrival in the fall of 1952, McVittie began the refurbishment of the Observatory's major instruments. The 12-inch refractor and the 3-inch transit telescope were restored in 1954 by the J.W. Fecker Company. He also began expanding the faculty. Dr. Stanley Wyatt joined the faculty in 1953, George Swenson and Ivan King in 1956, Kennth Yoss, John Dickel and James Kaler in 1964 and Edward Olson in 1966. With George Swenson's arrival, Illinois began a program of radio astronomy resulting in the Vermillion River Radio Observatory that opened in 1962. Prairie Observatory was an optical observatory consisting of a 40-inch telescope and was completed in 1967. By the time of Dr. McVittie's retirement in 1971, the one-astronomer department had expanded to nine faculty with research interests in relativity, cosmology, celestial mechanics, perturbation theory, dynamics of star clusters, planetary nebulae, planets, supernovae and radio astronomy. The department which produced only five advanced degrees prior to 1951 graduated 29 Masters and 14 Doctoral students during the McVittie administration.

On October 4, 1957, the very evening of the launch of Sputnik, students and faculty met at the observatory and constructed an improvised radio interferometer. They published the first precise ephemeris in the journal Nature in November. Their success helped gather momentum and funding for the radio astronomy program.

=== Current history ===
The observatory underwent major renovations and additions in 1956 and 1966 to accommodate the growing faculty (see architecture section below). In 1967, the 12 inch telescope at the observatory made its last professional photometric observations. The University of Illinois' Astronomy Department moved out of the building in 1979. In 1986, thousands gathered at the site to observe Comet Halley's journey into the inner Solar System.

The observatory is no longer used for research purposes, though the telescope is still used as a teaching tool in the university's astronomy classes. In addition, the University of Illinois Astronomical Society uses the telescope often for amateur astronomy and astrophotography. The observatory dome underwent a renovation that included repainting in 1996.

In 2009, Professors Leslie Looney and Benjamin McCall constructed a spectrometer on the ground floor of the observatory, and ran an optical fiber cable to the telescope in the dome. They used this to teach an astrochemistry class until the 50-fiber bundle was broken.

In 2013, the telescope was detached from its mount, lifted out of the dome through the dome slit, and placed on a truck to be shipped to Swarthmore, Pennsylvania to be refurbished by Ray Museum Studios. The telescope's optics were cleaned, as well as the exterior refinished. While the telescope was away, the dome was repainted, as were the interior walls and flooring. The total cost of the renovation was approximately $54,000.

== Equipment ==
The primary instrument is a refractor of 12 inches clear aperture and of 15 ft. focal length. The optics are by John A. Brashear of Pittsburgh and the mechanical parts by the Warner & Swasey Company of Cleveland. Eyepieces provide magnification ranging from 130 to 720 power.

It is mounted on a rectangular cast-iron column of two-tons weight that rests on the masonry pier. Through a glass door in the column you can see the driving clock that keeps the telescope turning westward in keeping with the stars, so that a star remains in view as long as the astronomer wishes to observe it. The telescope turns on two axes at the top of the column. One axis slants upwards toward the north pole of the heavens; the other at right angles to it, and it is to this one that the tube of the telescope is attached. Two large circles provide graduated scales for locating objects by their coordinates. The instrument can be turned on these axes toward any part of the sky. It is a heavy instrument, but so well balanced that the astronomer moves it easily with one hand.

The principle transit circle was a 3-inch Combined Transit and Zenith telescope designed by Warner & Swasey especially for Illinois. The objective, by John Brashear, was held in place by a special cell that compensated for the different temperature conductivities of the brass and glass so that temperature had no effect on the location or separation of the lenses. Designated as model M-505, the transit included a handing level, micrometer and a built in reversing mechanism. This transit was located in the east-central transit room allowing direct access to the clock room through a small window. The instrument cost $1200 in 1896.

The transit circle was capable of determining both right ascension and declination of a star, unlike the more simple and common transit instrument that can only determine the right ascension. Such an instrument could also be used to set the observatory's clocks by observing standard stars whose position was precisely known.

In addition there were three other smaller transit telescopes, two clocks by Clemens Riefler of Munich, and other accessories including sextants, chronometers, and teaching tools.

== Architecture ==
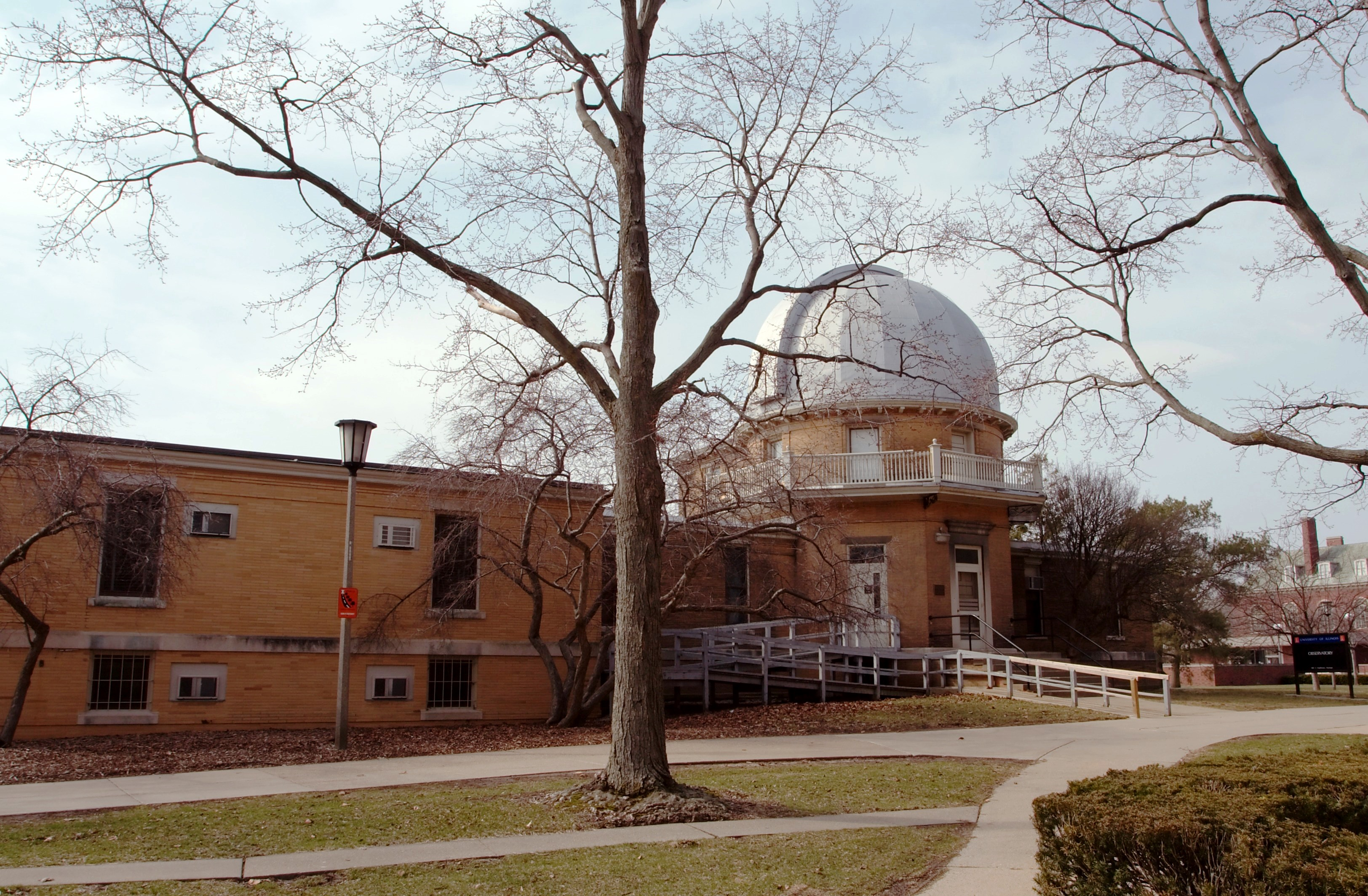
A view of the Observatory in 2008

The building, itself, is in a traditional observatory design, Colonial Revival style, following a T-plan. The dome rises 35 feet (11 m) in the air. The observatory was built on a one-story T-plan, facing north, of buff-colored Roman brick (from Indiana) and features limestone lintels and sills. The cross of the T is 75 feet (23 m) long east to west and 25 feet (7.6 m) deep, its stem is located to the south, centered along the east-west axis and is 26 feet (7.9 m) deep by 25 feet (7.6 m) wide. The octagonal observation tower rises 25 feet (7.6 m) into the air at the intersection of the T where it becomes a dome and continues to a height of 35 feet (11 m). At floor level of the second equatorial room a balustrade circles around the exterior of the tower. The tower is capped by a great circular limestone plate, which carries the dome track. Internally, the diameter of the dome is 24.5 feet (7.5 m) and its zenith 24 feet (7.3 m) above the floor. The dome slit, which still operates, has an opening of 44 inches (1,100 mm) and can be opened or closed by hand in seconds. The dome tower and equatorial room are original save a motor drive which replaced the old rope and sheave method of rotating the dome. As of September 2014, the motor drive was being serviced and the rope and sheave method was once again in use.

In the center of the equatorial room is the 1896 12-inch (300 mm) refractor telescope. Built by the firm of Warner and Swasey, Cleveland, Ohio, the scope is stabilized on a brick pier which extends down into the bedrock and is not attached to the building in any way. The telescope cost $4,500 and still has the original observer's chair mentioned in the contract with Bevis and Company at a cost of $25. The entrance hall, below the equatorial room, octagonal in shape, is centered on a brick pier. The entrance hall retains original stairs, newel posts, balustrades, and wood floors; it is still used for its original purpose, storage.

The east and west wings of the building once each contained a transit room. Each of the rooms had a mounted transit telescope on a brick pier; the piers are still visible in the basement below the transit rooms. The western transit rooms were converted into office space by the 1920s. The eastern transit rooms were converted to office space more recently.

The exterior of the observatory building has a brick cornice, with stone sills and lintels, stone water course, ornamental gutters, and original copper downspouts. Most of the building's windows are of the wooden double-hung variety and original, as are the front entrance door transom and concrete stoop. The original front balustrade has been replaced, however, the western stoop and ornamental iron balustrade is still original.

Aside from the transit room conversion to office space the building has seen other major work in the past. The southwest corner of the building was built in 1956, of cream colored brick, to house additional classrooms and office space. The addition of 1956 took care to replicate nearly every aspect of the original building except for color. Another major addition occurred in 1966 with the construction of the large east wing. Of the same cream colored brick as the 1956 addition, it also tried to mimic the building's finer details. The 1966 east wing addition provided for more office space. This project also included space for a new darkroom and a radio telescope laboratory. The observatory basement and the dome housing the refractor are still in use by the astronomy department at U of I and the University of Illinois Astronomical Society, a student organization on campus.

== Historic significance ==
The observatory holds significance in astronomy because of its association with the development of selenium and photoelectric cell. The cell revolutionized the science of astronomical photoelectric photometry by the use of electricity to measure the brightness of stars by providing a more precise and accurate measurement compared to the visual and photographic methods common at that time. This branch of astronomy measures stellar magnitude. The research regarding photometry was conducted on a 12-inch (300 mm) Warner and Swasey refractor telescope in the second-story equatorial room. As a result of Dr. Stebbins' work determining stellar magnitude using photoelectric photometry, it became standard technique. Due to this astronomical importance the observatory was listed on the National Register of Historic Places on November 6, 1986, and on December 20, 1989, the U.S. Department of Interior designated the U of I Observatory a National Historic Landmark.

== See also ==
- List of astronomical observatories
