= Albert Whitford (astronomer) =

American astronomer (1905–2002)

- Born: Albert Edward Whitford; October 22, 1905; Milton, Wisconsin, US
- Died: March 28, 2002 (aged 96); Madison, Wisconsin, US
- Resting place: Milton Cemetery; Milton, Wisconsin
- Education: Milton College; University of Wisconsin
- Known for: Photoelectric photometry
- Spouse: Eleanor Bell Whitelaw Whitford
- Children: William Curtis Whitford; Mary Eleanor Whitford Graves; Martha Neill Whitford Barss
- Awards: Prix Jules Janssen (1960); Henry Norris Russell Lectureship (1986); Bruce Medal (1996)
- Scientific career
- Fields: Astronomy; Astrophysics
- Workplaces: Washburn Observatory; Lick Observatory; Pine Bluff Observatory

Albert Edward Whitford (October 22, 1905 – March 28, 2002) was an American physicist and astronomer. He served as director of the Washburn Observatory of the University of Wisconsin-Madison and the Lick Observatory.

== Early life ==
Albert Whitford was born in Milton, Wisconsin, the son of Alfred and Mary Whitford. He earned his B.A. from Milton College (1926) and his Ph.D. from the University of Wisconsin (1932).

While studying physics at the University of Wisconsin–Madison, he worked as an assistant to astronomer Joel Stebbins helping him in his study of photoelectric photometry. Whitford developed a device for measuring small currents from photoelectric cells, which allowed them to measure fainter stars. He decided to become an astronomer and spent two years at Caltech and Mount Wilson Observatory as a postdoctoral fellow.

== Career ==
During World War II, Whitford worked in the MIT Radiation Laboratory. In 1948, he succeeded Stebbins as director of the Washburn Observatory and served as director until 1958. He was director of Lick Observatory from 1958–1968, and oversaw the completion of the Shane Telescope in 1959. He served as president of the American Astronomical Society from 1967–1970, and later served on the faculties of both the University of California, Santa Cruz and the University of Wisconsin–Madison.

The Whitford reddening curve, quantifying the interstellar absorption of light, was important in the mapping of the distribution of stars in the Milky Way. He also studied the stars in galactic nuclear bulges.

In 1954, Whitford was elected to the National Academy of Sciences. He was awarded the Prix Jules Janssen by the Société astronomique de France in 1960. In 1986, Whitford received the Henry Norris Russell Lectureship and in 1996 he was awarded the Bruce Medal.

== Death and legacy ==
Whitford died in Madison, Wisconsin, on March 28, 2002, and a memorial service was held in the auditorium of the Meriter Health Center in Madison.

The asteroid 2301 Whitford is named in his honor.

== Personal life ==
On October 23, 1937, Whitford married Eleanor Bell Whitelaw in Chicago, Illinois. They had three children (William, Mary, and Martha) and nine grandchildren.
