= Prairie Observatory =

Observatory in Illinois, US

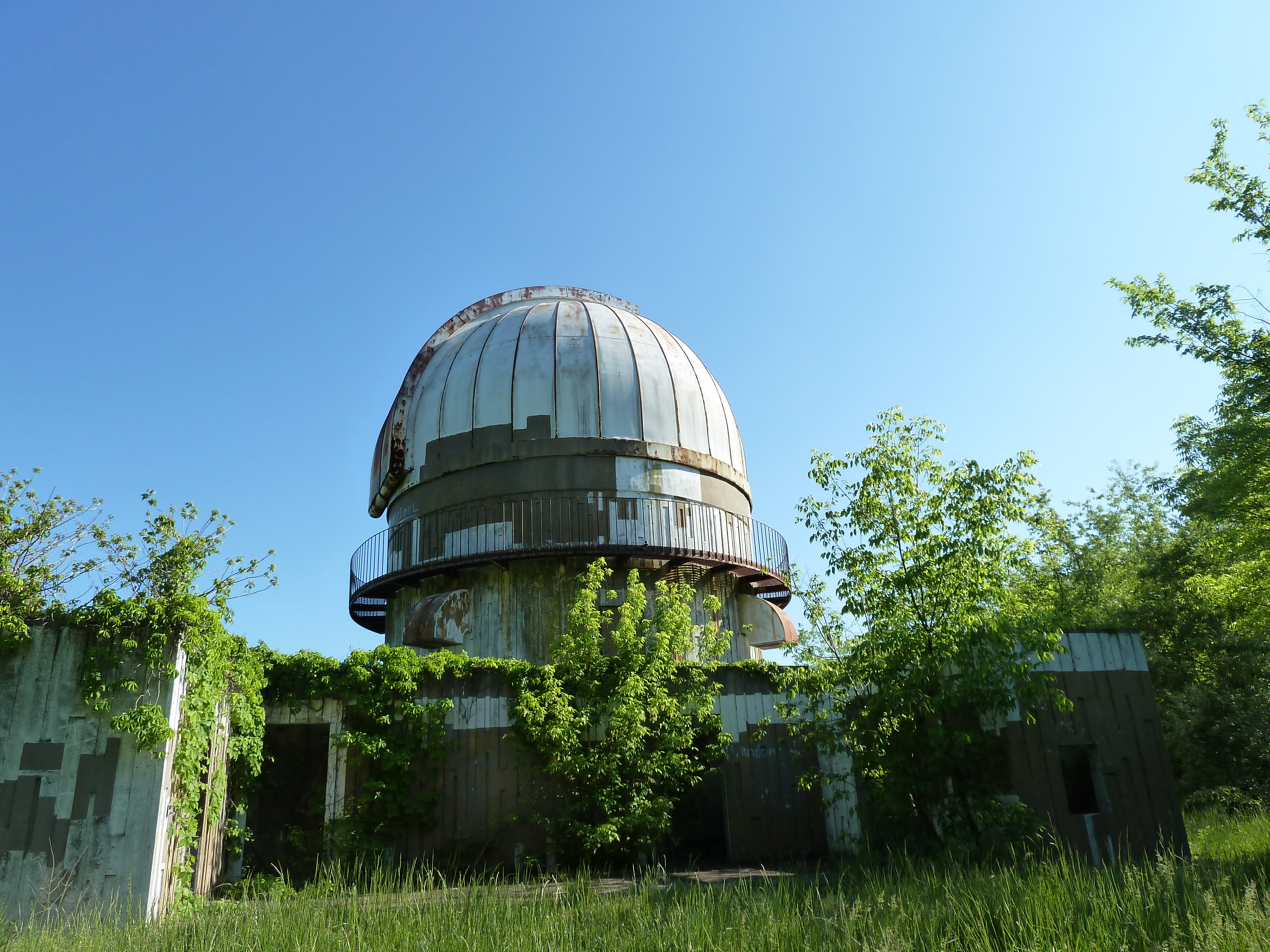
- North Facade
- Location: Douglas County, Illinois, United States
- Coordinates: 39.701784°N 88.053598°W
- Established: January 1969
- Closed: April 1, 1981

The Prairie Observatory was constructed near Oakland, Illinois by the University of Illinois at Urbana-Champaign's Department of Astronomy. The site was adjacent to Walnut Point State Park and provided an accessible but dark sky site only 35 miles from campus. The telescope went into operation in January 1969 and closed on April 1, 1981. In early 2024, the building was demolished by the Illinois Department of Natural Resources due to hazards the building posed to public health.

The observatory's principle telescope was a 40-inch (1.0 meter) Cassegrain reflector by Astro Mechanics Inc. The telescope itself cost about $244,000, most of that money coming from a National Science Foundation grant. The dome was 40-foot in diameter and connected to a main building that housed an apartment for astronomers. The telescope had an off-axis equatorial mount and was equipped for direct photography, spectroscopy, and photoelectric photometry. Most of the 80 research papers produced over the 11-years life of the observatory used a multicolor single-channel photometer. The photographic glass slides produced by the camera and the spectrograph are now stored in the university archives (series number 15/3/13).

In addition to the 40-inch telescope, a smaller dome housed a 4-inch Ross-Fecker camera. The camera was purchased in 1938 and was originally located in an observatory in Urbana. It remained in use until the telescope was vandalized in the 1980s. The photographic plates produced using that camera are now stored at Yerkes Observatory. The 15-foot dome for that telescope was returned to Champaign in 1986 where it is used by the local Champaign-Urbana Astronomical Society.

The 40-inch telescope was moved to San Diego State University’s Mount Laguna Observatory in April 1981 where it is still in active use. The building site in Walnut Point State Park is abandoned. It was demolished in early 2024 by the Illinois Department of Natural Resources due to its dilapidated condition and several accounts of unauthorized entry. An empty field currently remains where the building stood.

== See also ==
- List of astronomical observatories
