= Equatorial room =

Room containing a mounted equatorial telescope

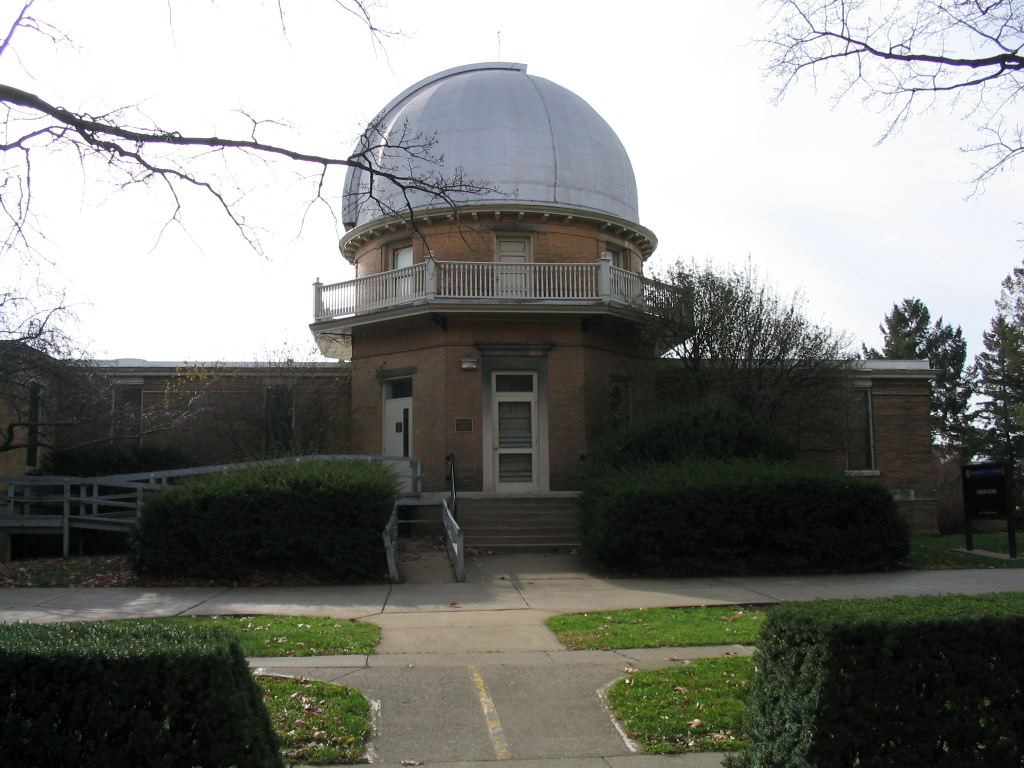
The equatorial room at the University of Illinois Observatory

An equatorial room, in astronomical observatories, is the room which contains an equatorial mounted telescope. It is usually referred to in observatory buildings that contain more than one type of instrument: for example buildings with an "equatorial room" containing an equatorial telescope and a "transit room" containing a transit telescope. Equatorial rooms tend to be large circular rooms to accommodate the range of motion of a long telescope on an equatorial mount and are usually topped with a dome to keep out the weather.

In some cases an observatory would move to a new location, or the equatorial telescope itself would be removed. The space would then be converted, for example, for use as a classroom or library. These peculiar rooms can sometimes be found in buildings at old colleges and towns, with their former use long forgotten.
