= Charles Wylie (astronomer) =

American astronomer

Charles Clayton Wylie (1886–1976) was born in Idana, Kansas, on June 18, 1886, and died in Cedar Rapids, Iowa, in April 1976. He earned his first degree from Park College in Missouri in 1908 and a master's degree from the University of Missouri in 1912. After working at the US Naval Observatory from 1913 to 1919, he went to the University of Illinois at Urbana-Champaign and was the first Ph.D. graduate from University of Illinois' astronomy department. He graduated with his doctorate in 1922 for his work "The Eclipsing Binary Sigma Aquilae, the Cepheid Variable Eta Aquilae."

Wylie remained at the University of Illinois Observatory as an instructor until 1925 when he left for the University of Iowa where he remained for the rest of his career in the department of mathematics and astronomy. Trained in photoelectric photometry by Joel Stebbins, he shifted his research focus to meteors and meteorites because of the lack of equipment at Iowa City. He often interviewed people who had seen meteors and collected samples of the meteorites. During the 1930s he corresponded with Fred Whipple concerning the origins or meteors. Wylie and Whipple agreed that the meteors were of solar system origin. He was the first vice-president of the Society for Research on Meteorites (now Meteoritical Society) when it organized in 1933.

He authored several books including Our starland: An easy guide to the study of the heavens, Astronomy, maps, and weather, and Problems in Practical Astronomy.
