= Cross Plains (town), Wisconsin =

Town in Dane County, Wisconsin

Cross Plains, Wisconsin
- Town
- Town of Cross Plains
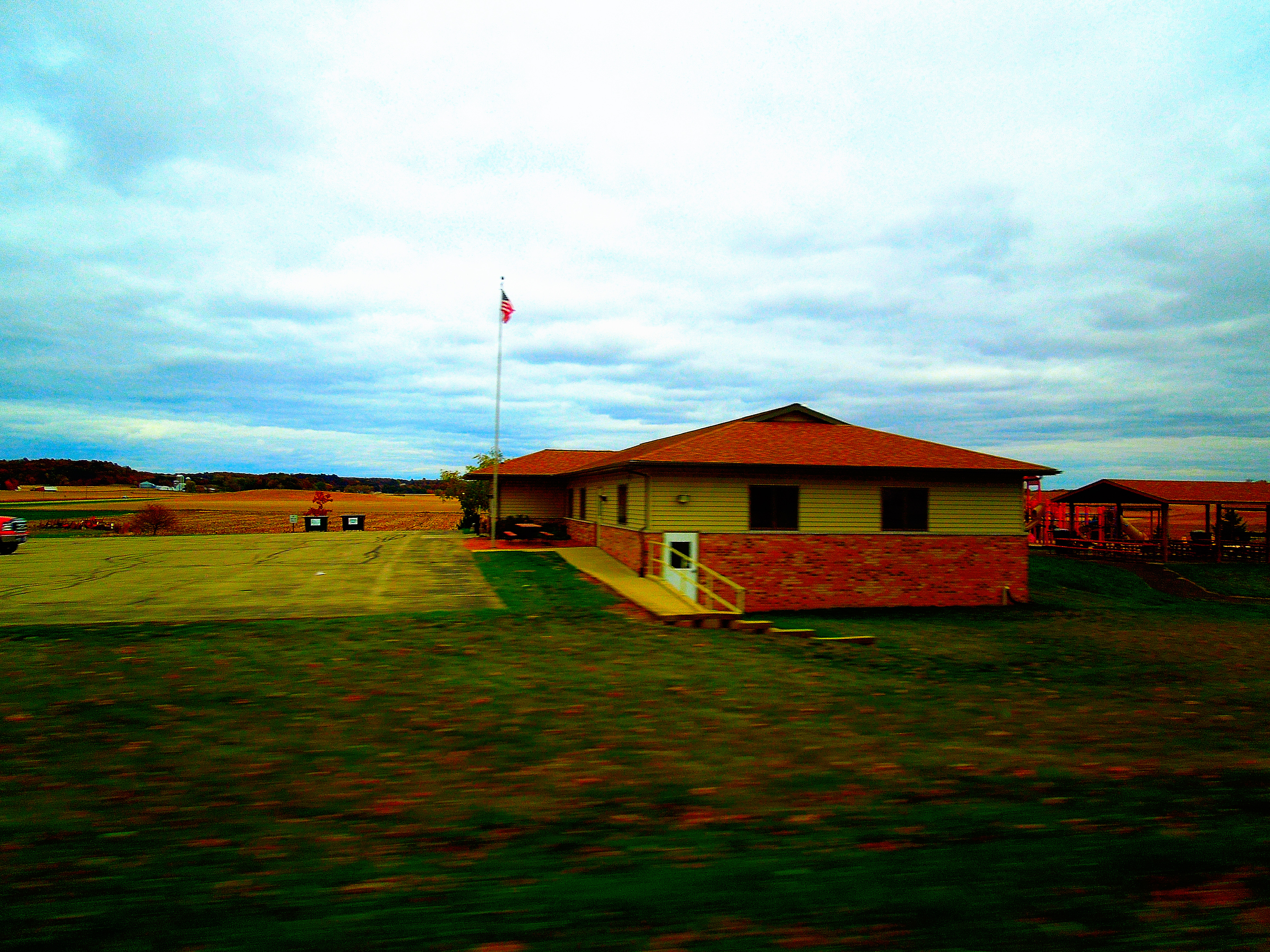
- Cross Plains Town Hall

- Location within Dane County, Wisconsin
- Coordinates: 43°04′45″N 89°39′46″W
- Country: United States
- State: Wisconsin
- County: Dane

Area
  - Total: 34.88 sq mi (90.3 km^{2})
  - Land: 34.72 sq mi (89.9 km^{2})
  - Water: 0.16 sq mi (0.41 km^{2})

Population (2020)
  - Total: 1,494
  - Density: 43.03/sq mi (16.61/km^{2})
- Time zone: UTC-6 (Central (CST))
  - Summer (DST): UTC-5 (CDT)
- Area code(s): 608 and 353
- GNIS feature ID: 1583030

Cross Plains is a town in Dane County, Wisconsin, United States. The population was 1,494 at the 2020 census. The Village of Cross Plains is located partially within the town. The unincorporated community of Pine Bluff is located in the town.

== Education ==
The Pine Bluff Observatory is in the town of Cross Plains.

== Geography ==
According to the United States Census Bureau, the town has a total area of 35.4 square miles (91.6 km^{2}), of which 35.3 square miles (91.5 km^{2}) is land and 0.04 square mile (0.1 km^{2}) (0.08%) is water.

== Demographics ==
At the 2000 census, there were 1,419 people, 513 households, and 398 families in the town. The population density was 40.2 people per square mile (15.5/km^{2}). There were 525 housing units at an average density of 14.9 per square mile (5.7/km^{2}). The racial makeup of the town was 98.03% White, 0.56% Black or African American, 0.49% Asian, 0.07% Pacific Islander, 0.07% from other races, and 0.78% from two or more races. 0.35% of the population were Hispanic or Latino of any race. Of the 513 households 36.3% had children under the age of 18 living with them, 72.1% were married couples living together, 3.1% had a female householder with no husband present, and 22.4% were non-families. 17.3% of households were one person and 6.6% were one person aged 65 or older. The average household size was 2.77 and the average family size was 3.17.

The age distribution was 28.6% under the age of 18, 4.2% from 18 to 24, 27.1% from 25 to 44, 27.8% from 45 to 64, and 12.3% 65 or older. The median age was 39 years. For every 100 females, there were 101.8 males. For every 100 females age 18 and over, there were 106.3 males.

The median household income was $66,055 and the median family income was $74,327. Males had a median income of $50,139 versus $31,875 for females. The per capita income for the town was $30,163. None of the families and 1.7% of the population were living below the poverty line, including no under eighteens and 2.5% of those over 64.
