= John Strong (educationalist) =

British educator

John Strong CBE FRSE FEIS LLD (15 January 1868 – 7 October 1945) was a 20th-century British educationalist. He was one of the creators of the Education Act (Scotland) 1918. This brought the many poorly-funded private Catholic schools in Scotland (mainly in the Glasgow area) into state control.

== Early life and education ==
Strong was born in Barrow-in-Furness on 15 January 1868. He trained as a teacher at Westminster Training College and then studied at the Yorkshire College (which became the University of Leeds in 1904) where he graduated with the degree of MA in around 1888.

== Academic career ==
In 1900 Strong became Rector of Montrose Academy. In 1914 he became Rector of the Royal High School, Edinburgh and saw it through the losses of the First World War.

In 1918 Strong returned to his alma mater, the University of Leeds, as Professor of Education where he remained until 1934.

== Honours ==
In 1907 Strong was elected a Fellow of the Royal Society of Edinburgh (FRSE). His proposers were Sir James Donaldson, John Horne, Frank W. Young and Cargill Gilston Knott.

== Marriage and children ==
In 1899 Strong married Ethel May Dobson. Their son was Major General Kenneth Strong, famed for his role in British military intelligence. His daughter Mildred Bond Strong married George C. McVittie.

== Death ==
Strong died on 7 October 1945 in Eastbourne, aged 77.

== Artistic recognition ==
Strong's portrait by Howard Somerville is held by the University of Leeds.

== Publications ==
- A History of Secondary Education in Scotland (1909)
- The Education Act (Scotland) 1918
