= Vermilion River Observatory =

Observatory in Illinois, US

- Alternative names: VRO
- Organization: University of Illinois Urbana-Champaign
- Location: Illinois
- Coordinates: 40°03′40″N 87°33′40″W
- Established: 1959
- Closed: 1981
- Telescopes: Illinois 120-foot telescope; Illinois 400-foot radio telescope

The Vermilion River Radio Observatory (VRO) was a research facility operated by the University of Illinois from 1959 to 1984, featuring a 400-foot (120 m) linear parabolic radio telescope. The instrument took advantage of natural terrain to form a reflector and antenna array that used the earth's rotation to sweep a sector of the sky for astronomical radio sources. The 420-acre (170 ha) site was a pioneering facility in radio astronomy.

== Parabolic array radio telescope ==
The site was chosen after an aerial survey indicated that the site was naturally contoured to require the least effort to excavate a 600-foot-long (180 m) by 400-foot-wide (120 m) north–south trough for the parabolic cylinder shape that would focus radio waves into a receiver array. Located near the Vermilion River, the site was about 45 miles (72 km) from the university campus, near Danville, Illinois. Work began in 1959. Once the natural ravine was shaped, it was covered with asphalt and wire mesh, forming a reflector aimed by the Earth's rotation to sweep the sky. A wood trestle 153 feet (47 m) high was built at the reflector's focus to carry the receivers. The array was configured to allow phasing adjustments to sweep 60 degrees of sky. The facility was suitable for conducting survey work over large areas of sky, but could not be used to study specific targets.

The telescope project was led by electrical engineering professor George Swenson, under the founding impetus of University of Illinois Astronomical Observatory director George C. McVittie. Professor Y.T. Lo designed the antenna array, using a logarithmic conical spiral concept originated by professor John Dyson. Feed elements and the recording system were designed by research engineer Kwang-Shui Yang and student Kenneth Seib, using commercial radio receiving equipment. The array was optimized for study at a 49-centimeter wavelength.

The array mapped a significant portion of the northern hemisphere's sky, allowing the compilation of a catalog of astronomical radio sources. It identified more than 1,000 discrete radio sources beyond the Milky Way, as well as radio-emitting ionized hydrogen regions within the Milky Way. The array found two new supernova remnants. The most notable radio source discovered by the VRO is active galactic nucleus VRO 42.22.01, the prototype for BL Lacertae objects.

== 120-foot steerable radio telescope ==
In 1967 Swenson proposed an array of three steerable 120-foot (37 m) parabolic dishes, which could be used to study individual features. The three receivers were to be used as an interferometer to achieve high angular resolution. The new telescope would operate at 49 centimeters and 18 centimeters. Only one of the three dishes was funded by the National Science Foundation and built to a conceptual design by Neil Stafford of the Stanford Research Institute, leaving it most effective as a spectrometer initially. It was built by university staff and students. Starting in 1974 it was linked to other locations to perform the very long baseline interferometry studies it was intended for.

== Channel 37 ==
The 49 cm band is equivalent to about 610 megahertz, coinciding with UHF television channel 37. After concern was expressed that even distant transmitters would interfere with astronomical research at the VRO site, the Federal Communications Commission decided in 1963 not to allocate Channel 37 to any transmitters in the United States.

== Closure ==
Erosion in the natural stream valley gradually deformed the linear reflector, and it was taken out of use by 1970. The site was repeatedly vandalized. A 1981 vandalism incident damaged the steerable dish enough that it was disabled, and the site was finally decommissioned in 1984. The property is used for ecological studies and cropland by the University of Illinois and Illinois state agencies. The old observatory buildings are used for laboratories.

== See also ==
- List of astronomical observatories
