= Mount Laguna Observatory =

Observatory in California, US

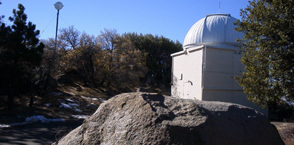
- Dome of the Smith (24") Telescope at MLO
- Alternative names: Mount Laguna Observatory 1m
- Organization: San Diego State University
- Observatory code: U83
- Location: Mount Laguna, California
- Coordinates: 32.8424°N 116.4280°W
- Altitude: 1,859 meters (6,099 ft)
- Established: 1968 (58 years ago)
- Website: MLO Facilities

Telescopes
- Illinois Telescope: 1.1 m (43 in) reflector
- Smith Telescope: 0.6 m (24 in) reflector
- Buller Visitors' Telescope: 0.5 m (20 in) reflector
- Claud Telescope: 1.25 m (49 in) reflector
- EvryScope: Multiple Aperture Survey
- Location within San Diego County, California
- Related media on Commons

Mount Laguna Observatory (MLO) is an astronomical observatory owned and operated by San Diego State University (SDSU). MLO is located approximately 75 kilometers (47 mi) east of downtown San Diego, California, on the eastern edge of Cleveland National Forest, in the Laguna Mountains on the SDSU Astronomy Campus near the hamlet of Mount Laguna.

MLO was dedicated on June 19, 1968, seven years after SDSU's Department of Astronomy became an independent academic department of SDSU's College of Sciences. The dedication took place during the 1968 summer meeting of the Astronomical Society of the Pacific. The telescope was operated in partnership with the University of Illinois at Urbana-Champaign (UIUC) until 2000. Currently, SDSU is working with the University of Kansas (KU) and the University of North Carolina at Chapel Hill on various projects.

== Telescopes ==
- The 1.06 m (42 in) MLO 40-inch telescope is a Cassegrain reflector built by Astro Mechanics in 1966. It was originally fitted with a 1.02 m (40 in) primary mirror which has since been replaced. It is known informally as the Illinois telescope because it was located at UIUC's Prairie Observatory until 1981.
- The 0.6 m (24 in) Clifford Smith 24-inch telescope is a Cassegrain reflector. It was built by the SDSU Department of Astronomy and used at the main campus from 1961 to 1966. In 1971, it was installed at MLO after modifications.
- The 0.52 m (20 in) Reginald Buller 21-inch Visitors' telescope was built in 1950 by J.W. Fecker, Inc. It was donated to SDSU by Reginald Buller and dedicated at MLO in 1988. It is used primarily by students for direct viewing, and for outreach.
- The EvryScope is a multiple aperture (24x) .062 m (2.4 in) survey telescope taking approximately {{#formatnum:8000}} square degree fields every two minutes. It is a collaboration between SDSU and UNC.

=== Future telescopes ===
- The 1.25 m (49 in) 50-inch Phillips Claud telescope. Originally planned in 2009, installation of the telescope began in late 2013. As of November 2016, the telescope installation had not been completed.

=== Former telescopes ===
- A 0.4 m (16 in) telescope built by Boller and Chivens was the first telescope at the observatory, and was replaced by the Claud telescope.
- A 0.4 m (16 in) telescope built by Nishimura and used by visitors was moved to the UCSD campus in 1988. It was replaced by the Buller telescope.
- The 1.0 m (39 in) Ultra-Light Technology for Research in Astronomy (ULTRA) telescope was a test bed for lightweight carbon fiber mirrors. It was located in the 0.4 m Boller and Chivens building from 2006–2008. Before it was installed, the original dome was replaced with a larger one, and the mount upgraded. The project was collaboration of SDSU, KU, Dartmouth College, and Composite Mirror Applications, Inc. (CMA) of Tucson, Arizona.

== See also ==
- Palomar Observatory
- List of astronomical observatories
