= Allan Eugene Updegraff =

American author and journalist

- Born: February 14, 1883; Grinnell, Iowa
- Died: December 7, 1965 (aged 82); Paris, France
- Occupations: Novelist; poet; short story writer
- Spouse(s): Edith Summers, 1908–11; Florence Mary Maule Cooley, 1914; Dora Loues Miller, 1924-1965 (his death)

Allan Eugene Updegraff (1883–1965) was an American-born novelist, poet, and editor. After he and his friend, Sinclair Lewis, dropped out of Yale during his junior year, he made a living working odd jobs, as well as writing stories for magazines and newspapers. In 1917 he had his first novel published. He moved to Paris in the mid-1920s, where he lived until his death in 1965. In addition to his six novels, he published poetry, short stories and essays, as well as having a short stint as a book reviewer.

== Early life ==
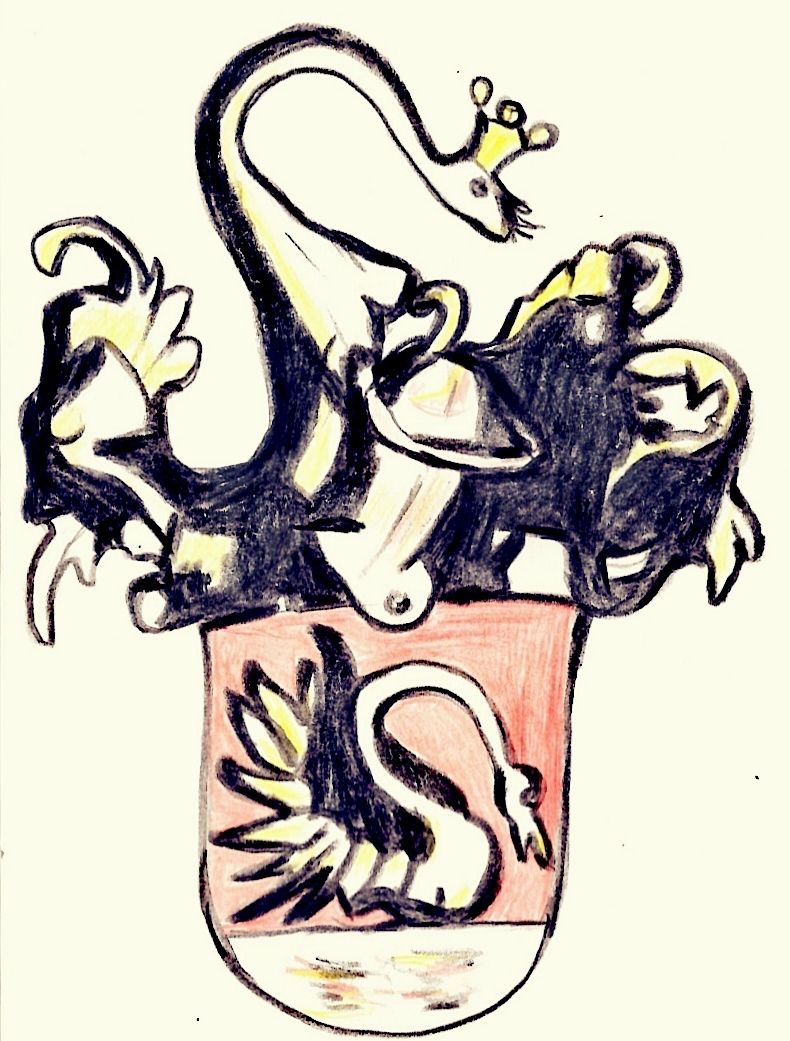
Possible, but bot proven coat of arms Op den Graeff as descendants of Herman op den Graeff (Heraldic representation by Matthias Laurenz Gräff based on the Krefeld Op den Graeff stained glass window from 1630, which may depict the “Lohengrin swan” of the Kleve coat of arms in one window)

Allan Eugene Updegraff was born into a prominent Quaker family, the son of William Ross Updegraff (1859–1940) and his first wife Laura Alda (née Heberling; 1863–1895) on February 14, 1883, in Grinnell, Iowa. David Brainard Updegraff (1830–1894), a Quaker minister was his paternal grandfather. They belonged to the Op den Graeffs, a German family of Dutch origin and where direct descendants of Herman op den Graeff, mennonite leader of Krefeld, and his grandson Abraham op den Graeff, one of the founders of Germantown and in 1688 signer of the first protest against slavery in colonial America.

After graduating from the public schools in Springfield, Missouri, Updegraff attended Drury College, also in Springfield, for a year. In the Fall of 1903 he entered Yale University. During his freshman year he won the annual award for "excellence in English" for his paper on James Fenimore Cooper, for which he received a $30 prize. While at Yale Updegraff was the editor of the monthly college magazine, the Yale College Monthly. He also befriended Harry Sinclair Lewis (better known as simply Sinclair Lewis), a young, literary student, and the two became roommates. Before graduating from Yale, in October 1906, both Updegraff and Lewis dropped out of Yale. They joined Upton Sinclair's communist community in Englewood, New Jersey, called Helicon Hall. The two worked as janitors, although they had been promised by Sinclair that they would be allowed to pursue their literary careers, During their brief time there, Lewis became engaged to Upton Sinclair's secretary, Edith Summers. After a month, during which Lewis and Updegraff spent most of their time "carrying around beds and mattresses and tending a furnace that insisted upon going out," the two left and moved into a tenement on the lower east side in New York City, on Avenue B between Fourteenth and Fifteenth Streets. Updegraff did not remain in his new apartment very long, and in the summer of 1907 he and a friend, Joseph Barrat, began a journey on foot from New York to Fiji, by way of San Francisco, although some accounts had him going out west to seek fresher air to help him get over a bout of malaria. However, the two aborted their travels, and Updegraff returned to New York in October 1907. Upon his return he replaced his friend Sinclair Lewis in two important roles. First, he took over Lewis position as assistant editor at Transatlantic Tales, and second, he became engaged to Summers, after she broke up with Lewis. Neither move caused a rift in the friendship between Updegraff and Lewis. During this early part of his life Updegraff supported himself with a number of clerical positions, including at the Charity Organization Society and Publishers' Newspaper Syndicate. In 1908 Updegraff and Summers were married, and the couple had two children, a son and a daughter. However, the marriage did not last long, and the two were divorced in 1911. About 1914 he married Florence Mary Maule Cooley (1879–1949), a noted suffragist. They had a son, David Maule Updegraff in 1917. David was in the US Navy and Naval Reserves between 1942 and 1946, and later a scientist. He died in New York City in 2004. In 1925 Allan Eugene married his third wife, the freelance writer and fashion consultant Dora Loues Miller (1889–1968), who he remained married to for more than forty years, until his death in 1965.

== Early writing career ==
One of his earliest works to be published was his poem, "A Touch of Nature", published in The Reader Magazine in 1905. From 1907 to 1910 Updegraff had a series of stories, poems and essays published in collections and in newspapers across the country. Some of the short stories include: "The Winner of the Game", published in the November 1909 edition of Short Stories; and "The Man's Wife", published in Ainslee's Magazine in December 1909. Some of his essays/short stories published in national newspapers included: "A German Alliance", "Two Mornings", "The Wash-Publish Machine", "Mr. Boggs Pulls Wires", and "That Remarkable Infant". His poetry appeared in numerous anthologies, including a monthly literary publication called The Smart Set, as well as in newspapers, such as "Bacchic" in 1907 in the New Castle Herald, and "The Incarnation" in the Los Angeles Herald in 1908.

During the 1910s, Updegraff continued to publish stories in magazines and newspapers. Some of those publications included McClure's, The Coming Nation, and Scribner's. The Washington Times praised Updegraff's short story, "The White Light Liar", about a doorman at a Broadway restaurant. The Times called the story "a gem", and stated that Upegraff had a "... sure touch of inspiration, backed by what seems the largest fund of information and experience ever accorded a writing man." During this period, Updegraff also made money as a critic, reviewing others' books. He also continued to publish stories in newspapers, such as "A Gentleman From Jupiter".

In 1915, Updegraff was one of thirty-one signatories to a letter charging John D. Rockefeller Jr. with murder for his role in events leading to the Ludlow Massacre and the subsequent convictions of striker leaders

Updegraff's first novel, Second Youth (1917), was published by Harper & Brothers to much literary fanfare, The New York Times opining that out of the new writers emerging, "none [is] more promising in a number of ways [than] Allan Updegraff." At this point in time Updegraff was living in Woodstock, New York. He also became the editor of the local magazine, The Ploughshare. In 1917, Updegraff agreed to be one of several native Iowans to contribute to a book to be printed to benefit the Iowa Red Cross. Entitled Prairie Gold, the book was a collection of stories, poems and sketches, with all profits going to help the Red Cross' war effort. In July 1918, it was announced that Updegraff's second novel, Strayed Revellers would be released that fall, and the novel was released by the end of that August. The New York Times called it, "a keen social satire, always an amusing comedy, and it ends a romance of parts." The Oakland Tribune gave the book a very good review, stating it was "... one of the 'most different' books of the year, a rollicking reaction, and the find of the season." The Chicago Daily Tribune also gave the novel a good review, calling it a delicious satire. They said the novel was "... shocking, but its awfully funny and at times kind of high and fine, and always nicely naughty."

In 1918, in celebration of the end of the First World War, Updegraff published a poem in The New York Times, entitled, "The Bells–The Bells of Victory!"

In 1921 he went to work for the Literary Digest, where he spent the next five years on the editorial staff. While working for the Digest, Updegraff's first novel, Second Youth, was made into a film of the same name in 1924. Produced by the short-lived Distinctive Pictures, it was distributed by Goldwyn Pictures, and starred the famous husband–wife acting duo of Alfred Lunt and Lynn Fontanne. In 1925 Updegraff published his third novel, Dancers in the Wind, about the romance between a weary business woman and a retired philosopher. In 1926 he moved to Paris to pursue his writing career.

== Years in Europe ==
After his move to Paris, Updegraff published his fourth novel, Whatever We Do, in 1927; a chronicle of a week in the life of some American tourists along the French Riveria. The Oakland Tribune gave the book a good review, calling it an "... amusing, shocking and biting novel ...." They felt it was a "... book of contradictions, one of surprise and beauty as well as one of many drinks and loose adventures," and they complimented Updegraff's writing style, stating that his methods "... through force of rare skill, lifts the reader from his chair." By the end of November 1928, Updegraff was visiting the United States, and it was reported that he had already begun work on his fifth novel, which was scheduled for publication in 1929. However, the book, titled Native Soil, was not published until the beginning of 1930, and dealt with the return of a young man from living abroad in Europe to his home town of Springfield, Illinois. There, he feels that the pace of Paris is much less fast-paced than the growing town of his youth. He returns to Europe, unable to cope with the changes. The News Enterprise Association, one of the leading news services of the era, gave the novel a sparkling review, calling the novel "... a tale of singular charm." They went on to say, "Mr. Updegraff writes with fine insight and sympathy, and his book is no cheap shocker. It is well written and thoughtful...."

It would be over a decade before his next book was published. Prior to its publication a curious instance occurred: the novels galleys had to be recalled and altered due to one of the artists who was working on the book having the same name as one of the characters in the book, as well as living in the same artist's colony which served as the novel's setting. His sixth book was titled The Hills Look Down, and was published in 1941, to positive reviews.

Updegraff died in Paris on December 7, 1965, survived by his wife of over 40 years, Dora Loues Miller.

== Partial list of works ==
=== Novels ===
- Second Youth: Being, In the Main, Some Account of the Middle Comedy in the Life of a New York Bachelor. A Novel. New York and London: Harper & Brothers, [1917]
- Strayed Revellers: A Novel of Modernistic Truth and Intruding War. New York: Henry Holt & Company, 1918
- Dancers in the Wind. New York: Boni & Liveright, 1925
- Whatever We Do. New York: The John Day Company, 1927
- Native Soil, A Novel, John Day Co., 1930
- The Hills Look Down, W. Funk, 1941

=== Short stories and essays ===
- "From a Skyscraper" (1912)
- "Taming the Terror" (1912)
- "The Golden Vanite" (1913)
- "Her Own Life" (1913)
- "The Credit" (1913)

=== Poetry ===
- Five Rimes of Five Nations in Time of War. Maverick Press. 1917.
- Poems and Impressions. Heritage House. 1953.

=== Other works ===
- The Literary Digest Atlas of the New Europe and the Far East. New York: Funk and Wagnalls. 1922.
