= Charles A. Gunn =

American architect

Charles Alexander Gunn or Charles A. Gunn (1870–1945) was an American architect, and later a missionary architect, active in the late 19th and early 20th centuries. He designed Burnham Hospital in Champaign and the University of Illinois Observatory, on campus at the University of Illinois, in Urbana.

== Personal life and education ==
He was born November 22, 1870, in Chicago and graduated from the University of Illinois with a B.S. in architecture in 1892. He was an Assistant in Architecture at the university from 1893 to 1896. Later he worked in New York 1897–1903 and Pittsburgh 1903–1907.

== Career ==
Gunn became a Presbyterian missionary involved in work to the Philippines, South China and Hawaii. He served as executive secretary of the Layman's Missionary Movement in 1909 and was the Philippines mission architect from 1916 to 1921. As the Presbyterian representative in the Missions Architects Bureau, he supervised the construction of the Missions Building located at 169 Yuanmingyuan Road in Shanghai.

Around 1926–27, he co-authored a pamphlet "Missions and Architecture – Residences" together with Roy L. Creighton

His daughter Harriet married Presbyterian missionary Roger Cumberland, who was shot dead in N Iraq in 1938. This understandably seems to have altered the course of Charles and his wife's lives. Finally in 1940 he was an instructor at the American University of Cairo, Egypt before returning to the United States, where they had responsibilities towards their widowed daughter and two fatherless granddaughters. He died October 13, 1945.
