= Village Reconstruction Organization =

Indian non-governmental organization

- Abbreviation: VRO
- Established: 1969; 57 years ago
- Founder: Michael Windey
- Headquarters: Pass Road, Pedakakani; Guntur, Andhra Pradesh, India
- Coordinates: 16°19′49.02″N 80°29′11.28″E
- President: Cletus Daisy
- Director: Peter Daniel
- Website: vroindia.org

Village Reconstruction Organization is a non-governmental organization in Guntur, Andhra Pradesh, India. The organization was founded by Belgian Jesuit Michael A. Windey and is supported largely by European organizations and donor cities.

VRO primarily supports impoverished, structurally weak, and unregistered villages in the coastal regions of Southeast India. Since 1969, it has helped rebuild 505 of these villages, many of which have been destroyed by natural catastrophes. The organization assists with the construction of villages, and facilities within the villages: homes, schools, childcare and community centres, especially among the dalits.

As well as providing villagers with advice, VRO supplies funding towards the creation of training and health centers, along with programs for the support of women.

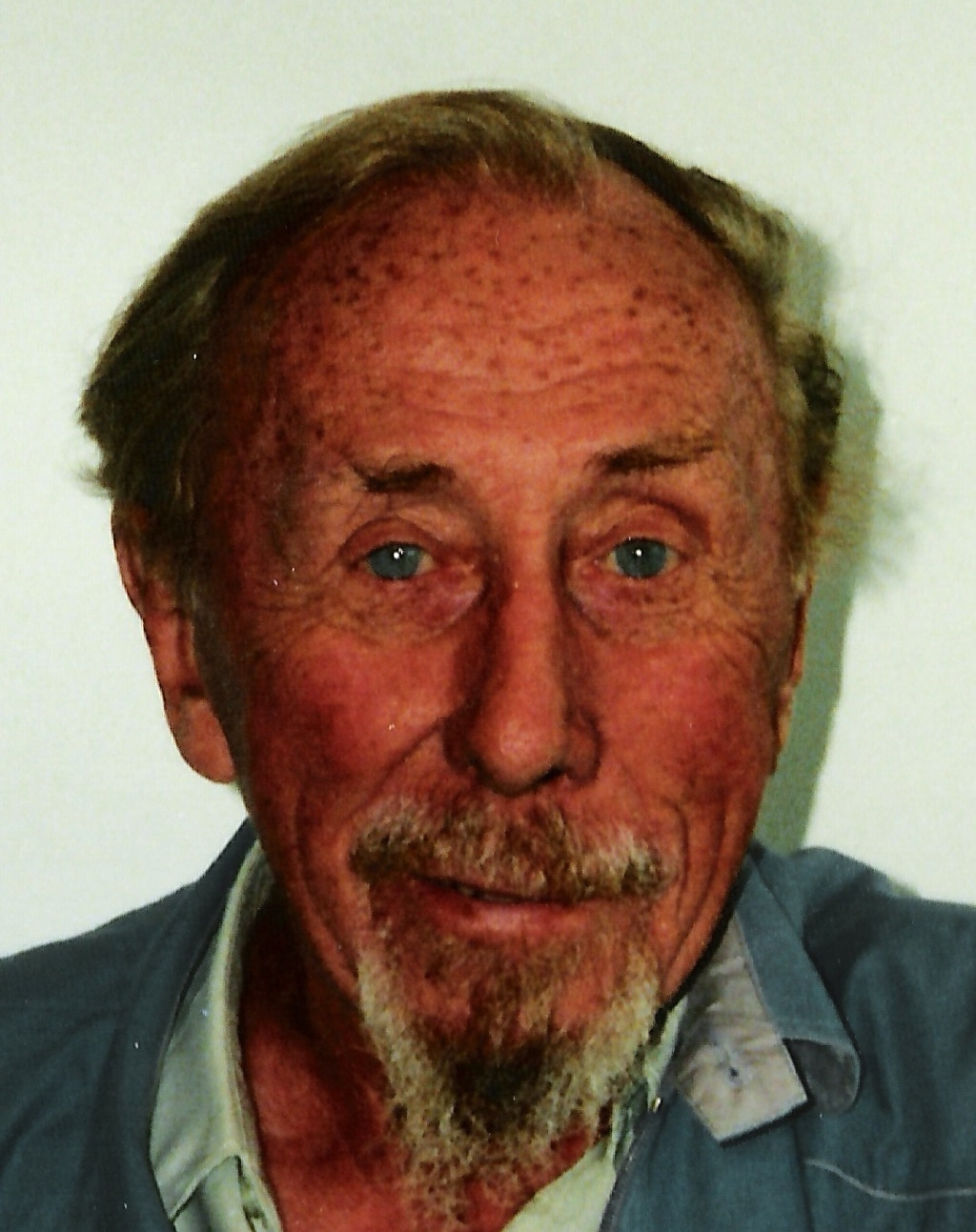
Michael A. Windey

== Bibliography ==
- Josef Hainz. (Hrsg.): Feuer muß brennen. Dörfer für Indien.. For Michael A. Windey, SJ, on the occasion of his 75th birthday on 28 April 1996, by his friends in Europe. Hardcover, Kelkheim-Eppenhain, self publisher, 2nd ed. (1996).
- Sustainable Development. Theoretische Konzeption und Fallbeispiel.. Seminar work by Tobias Schmitt, University of Tübingen, geographical institute (SS 1997), available via VRO Deutschland eV.
- Felix Duffner: Nutzung der Wasserkraft durch Wasserräder. Institute for Fluid Dynamics and Flow Machines at the University of Fridericana, Karlsruhe (TH), August 1993, available through VRO Deutschland eV.
