= Pine Bluff Observatory =

Observatory in Wisconsin, US

- Organization: University of Wisconsin–Madison
- Location: Cross Plains, Wisconsin
- Coordinates: 43.0777°N 89.6717°W
- Altitude: 362 meters (1,188 ft)
- Established: 1958
- Website: Pine Bluff Observatory

Telescopes
- 36-Inch Telescope: 0.9 m reflector
- 16-Inch Telescope: 0.4 m reflector

The Pine Bluff Observatory (PBO) is an astronomical observatory located in the town of Cross Plains, Wisconsin (US) about 24 kilometers (15 mi) west of Madison. PBO is owned and operated by the University of Wisconsin–Madison (UW-Madison). It opened in 1958, and is mainly used by students and faculty of UW-Madison for instruction and research. PBO also provides a facility for testing new instruments. Recent research conducted at PBO includes measuring the lunar sodium tail, monitoring circumstellar disks around Be stars, and studying the warm ionized medium.

== See also ==
- Washburn Observatory
- List of astronomical observatories
