= George C. McVittie =

British mathematician and cosmologist

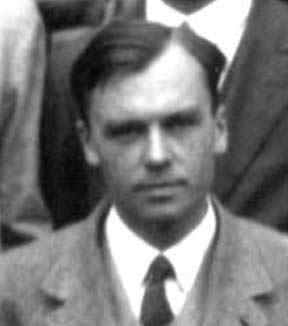
George McVittie portrait

George Cunliffe McVittie FRSE FRAS OBE (1904–1988) was a British mathematician and cosmologist. He is best known for his contributions towards radio astronomy.

== Life ==
McVittie was born on 5 June 1904 in Smyrna in Turkey, where his father, Frank S. McVittie, was a merchant. His mother, Emily Caroline Weber, lived in Greece but was of British descent. George was raised bilingual in French and English.

From 1923 he studied mathematics and physics at the University of Edinburgh receiving his degree (MA) in 1928. He then went to Christ's College, Cambridge where he studied for his doctorate (PhD) under Prof Arthur Eddington. From 1930 to 1934 he was Assistant Lecturer at the University of Leeds, 1933-34 Lecturer at the University of Edinburgh and 1936-1958 Reader at King's College, University of London. In 1933 he became a fellow of the Royal Astronomical Society, being elected in 1933. During World War II he established and directed the meteorological section at Bletchley Park, which monitored weather conditions in enemy territory by deciphering coded weather forecasts.

In 1943 he was elected a Fellow of the Royal Society of Edinburgh. His proposers were David Gibb, Ivor Etherington, Robert Schlapp and Alexander Aitken. From 1948 he was a professor at Queen Mary's College, University of London.

He then worked in America from 1952 to 1972 as professor at the University of Illinois Observatory of the University of Illinois at Urbana-Champaign where he built a small astronomy department, one of the leading in the country. He was awarded Guggenheim Fellowships in 1962 and 1970. His administrative skills meant that he became secretary of the American Astronomical Society.

From 1972 to 1988 he held an honorary professorship at the University of Kent in Canterbury, where in 1985 he received an honorary doctorate.

He died in Canterbury on 8 March 1988.

== Legacy ==
Asteroid 2417, McVittie was named after him. The George C. McVittie Elementary School in Drayton Plains, Michigan was also named in his honor.

== Family ==
In 1934, McVittie married Mildred Bond Strong (1906–1985) daughter of John Strong FRSE (1868-1945).

== Publications ==
- 1937: Cosmological Theory (2nd Edition 1949; 1952 reprint)
- 1956: General Relativity and Cosmology (2nd edition 1965)
- 1961: Fact and Theory in Cosmology
