= Alice Maxwell Lamb Updegraff =

American scientist (1863-1952)

- Born: March 7, 1863; Madison, Wisconsin, U.S.
- Died: April 3, 1952 (aged 89); Saanich, British Columbia, Canada
- Occupation: Scientist

Alice Maxwell Lamb Updegraff (March 7, 1863 – April 3, 1952) was an American scientist who worked at Washburn Observatory and the Argentine National Observatory in the 1880s.

== Biography ==
Lamb was born in Madison, Wisconsin, the daughter of Francis Jones Lamb and Ellen Ware Lamb. She graduated from high school in Madison in 1879. She completed a bachelor's degree at the University of Wisconsin–Madison in 1884, and a master's degree in astronomy in 1885. At Wisconsin, she was a charter member of the school's first chapter of the Delta Gamma sorority.

Lamb was an assistant astronomer at the Washburn Observatory in Wisconsin from 1885 to 1887, and at the Argentine National Observatory in Córdoba, Argentina, from 1887 to 1890. In both locations she was in charge of the observatory's time service. She also worked on German scientific translations.

Lamb married naval commander and astronomy professor Milton Updegraff in 1887; they had three daughters, Helen, Mabel, and Ruth. Helen died in 1932 and Mabel died in 1937. Her husband died in 1938, and she died in 1952, at the age of 89, in British Columbia.

== Publications ==
- "Some Observations of the 303 Stars between 5h and 12h of Right Ascension" (1886, with Milton Updegraff)
- "A Saddle Ride Across the Andes" (1890)
- Observations With The Meridian Circle (1890, with Milton Updegraff)
