= Joel Stebbins =

American astronomer

- Born: June 30, 1878; Omaha, Nebraska
- Died: March 16, 1966 (aged 87); Palo Alto, California
- Education: University of Nebraska
- Scientific career
- Fields: Astronomy
- Workplaces: University of Illinois at Urbana-Champaign and University of Wisconsin–Madison
- Doctoral advisor: William Wallace Campbell

Joel Stebbins (July 30, 1878 – March 16, 1966) was an American astronomer who pioneered photoelectric photometry in astronomy. He was director of the University of Illinois Observatory from 1903 to 1922 where he performed innovative work with the selenium cell. In 1922 he became director of the Washburn Observatory at the University of Wisconsin–Madison where he remained until 1948. After 1948, Stebbins continued his research at Lick Observatory until his final retirement in 1958.

Stebbins brought photoelectric photometry from its infancy in the early 1900s to a mature technique by the 1950s, when it succeeded photography as the primary method of photometry. He used the new technique to investigate eclipsing binaries, the reddening of starlight by interstellar dust, colors of galaxies, and variable stars.

== Early life and education ==
Joel Stebbins, then a graduate student, at Lick Observatory about 1902 posing next to the 36-inch refractor.

Joel Stebbins was born in Omaha, Nebraska, on July 30, 1878, the son of Charles Stebbins, an office worker at the Union Pacific Railroad and his wife Sara Ann née Stubbs. Stebbins had two sisters, Eunice and Millicent.

He attended elementary and high school in Omaha, before entering the University of Nebraska in 1896. He received his Bachelor of Science (BS) degree in 1899, and remained for a year as a graduate student before leaving for the University of Wisconsin–Madison, where he studied astronomy at the Washburn Observatory under George C. Comstock.

== Career ==
Stebbins published his first paper, concerning the light curve of Nova Persei with Comstock in 1901. He then received a fellowship from the Lick Observatory. He earned his Doctor of Philosophy (PhD) degree there under the supervision of William Wallace Campbell, writing a thesis on the spectra of Omicron Ceti. His was only the third PhD to be awarded for astronomy by the University of California, Berkeley. His thesis was subsequently published in the Astrophysical Journal in 1903.

Even before Stebbins received his doctorate, he took a job as an instructor in astronomy at the University of Illinois at Urbana-Champaign and director of the University of Illinois Observatory. He married May Louise Prentiss, who had been a classmate at the University of Nebraska, in Lincoln on June 27, 1905. They had two children.

Stebbins began making observations with a polarizing photometer. Frustrated by its use, he worked with F.C. Brown to develop a photometer based on a selenium cell. Beginning in 1907, Stebbins began the first measurements using the selenium cell photometer first on the moon and then later, as the sensitivity of the instrument was improved, on variable stars. He examined eclipsing binaries such as Algol starting in 1910. By 1913, Henry Norris Russell had developed the theory of eclipsing binaries, and Stebbins realized that there were many undiscovered ones. He soon found that Beta Aurigae and Delta Orionis were eclipsing binaries. Further discoveries followed.

The development of the photoelectric cell by Jakob Kunz revolutionized astronomical photometry. Kunz's photoelectric cells were many times more sensitive than what was available commercially and therefore able to detect faint star light. In 1915, Stebbins used the new photometers to examine Beta Lyrae, a more irregular binary system. The new equipment allowed observations of increasingly faint stars. Stebbins work was recognized with the American Academy of Arts and Sciences' Rumford Prize in 1913, and the United States National Academy of Sciences' Henry Draper Medal in 1915. The University of Illinois Observatory has been designated a National Historic Landmark based on the significance of Stebbins's and Kunz's work.

In 1922, Stebbins relocated to the University of Wisconsin–Madison, where he became the director of the Washburn Observatory in succession to George C. Comstock. Stebbins conducted systematic photometric studies of the O-type and B-type main-sequence stars and globular clusters. In later years, he became interested in cosmic dust. His students included Olin J. Eggen, Charles M. Huffer, Gerald Kron and Albert Whitford.

== Retirement ==
Stebbins retired from the University of Wisconsin-Madison and the Washburn Observatory in 1948 at the age of seventy, and then went to work at the Lick Observatory, collaborating with Gerald Kron, who had once been his student. They used photometric methods to obtain new values for the luminosity of the Cepheids. This confirmed Walter Baade's extragalactic distance scale.

Having dealt with the bright Cepheids, Stebbins and Kron used photometric techniques to study the Sun, which is orders of magnitude brighter than any other object in the sky. Obtaining an accurate assessment of its stellar color and magnitude. He retired for good at the age of eighty.

Stebbins also contributed to ornithology, with his pioneering paper, with E.A. Fath, The Use of Astronomical Telescopes in Determining the Speeds of Migrating Birds.

== Later life and death ==
In his later years, he suffered from leukaemia. He died at Palo Alto hospital on March 16, 1966. He was survived by his wife May, son Robert and daughter Isabelle. Some of his papers are in the University of Illinois Archives, but most of his correspondence and scientific papers are preserved in the University of Wisconsin-Madison Archives.

Some of his correspondence, related especially to his early and later days at Lick Observatory, resides in the Mary Lea Shane Archive of Lick Observatory, which is held at the archives of the University of California-Santa Cruz.

== Honors ==
=== Awards ===
- Rumford Prize of the American Academy of Arts and Sciences (1913)
- Henry Draper Medal of the National Academy of Sciences (1915)
- Bruce Medal of the Astronomical Society of the Pacific (1941)
- Gold Medal of the Royal Astronomical Society (1950)
- Henry Norris Russell Lectureship of the American Astronomical Society (1956)

=== Honors ===
- Elected to the United States National Academy of Sciences (1920)
- Elected to the American Academy of Arts and Sciences (1921)
- Elected to the American Philosophical Society (1925)

=== Named after him ===
- The crater Stebbins on the Moon
- Asteroid 2300 Stebbins
