= Washburn Observatory =

Observatory in Wisconsin, US

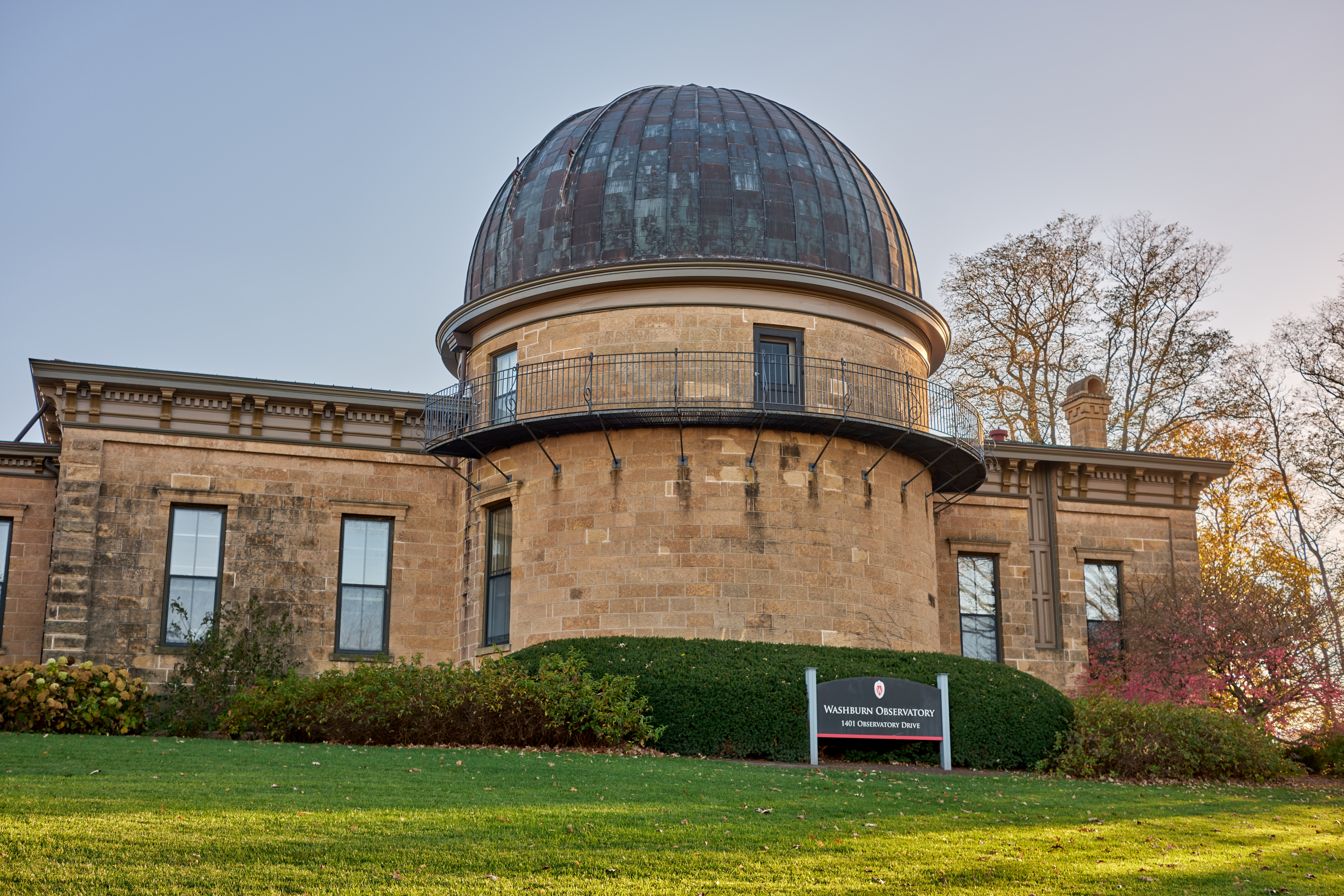
- Alternative names: University of Wisconsin–Madison Washburn Observatory
- Named after: Cadwallader C. Washburn
- Organization: University of Wisconsin–Madison
- Observatory code: 753
- Location: Madison, Wisconsin, US
- Coordinates: 43°04′35″N 89°24′32″W
- Website: www.astro.wisc.edu/the-public/public-observing-at-washburn/
- Telescopes: 15.6-inch Clark refractor
- Related media on Commons
- Washburn Observatory
- U.S. National Register of Historic Places
- Built: 1881
- Architect: Jones, David R.
- Architectural style: Italianate
- NRHP reference No.: 85000575
- Added to NRHP: 3/14/1985

The Washburn Observatory (obs. code: 753) is an astronomical observatory located at 1401 Observatory Drive on the University of Wisconsin–Madison campus in Madison, Wisconsin, United States. Completed in 1881, it was a major research facility for about 50 years. Today, it is home to the UW-Madison College of Letters and Science Honors Program, while the telescope remains in use by students in introductory astronomy courses and the general public during open houses and viewings.

== History ==
The observatory is named after the former Wisconsin governor, Cadwallader C. Washburn. In 1876, the Wisconsin State Legislature passed "An Act to permanently provide for deficiencies in the University fund income" to which Washburn added a provision that allocated a sum of $3000 USD per year over three years for the establishment of astronomy instruction and a corresponding observatory. This money was not to come from state funds, but was to be raised with property tax.

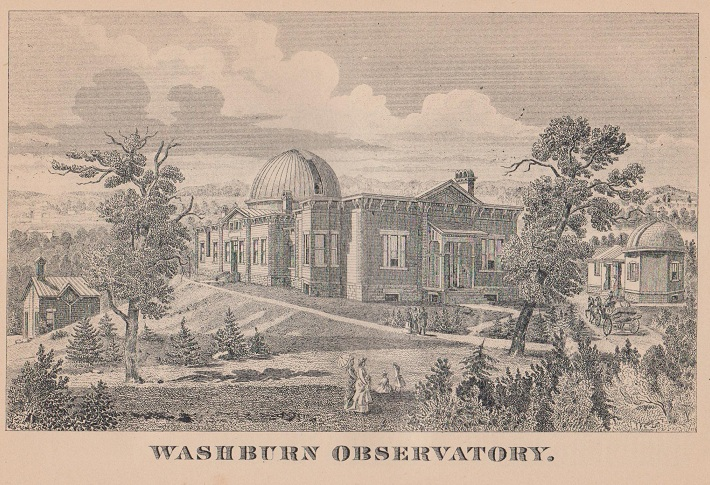
Washburn Observatory in the 1885 Wisconsin Blue Book

On September 18, 1877, John Bascom, the president of the University, announced that Washburn would provide an observatory with a telescope that was to be larger than the 15-inch refractor at Harvard. Washburn, along with the Board of Regents, chose the site of the observatory to be removed from the city of Madison with the university campus acting as the divider. The site was about 100 feet above Lake Mendota on the north side of campus and, at the time, was surrounded by a vineyard and orchard. Construction on the observatory was started in May, 1878, and a contract was given to Alvan Clark to build the telescope. It was decided that the telescope would have a diameter of 15.6 inches, which would make it the third largest in the United States.

James C. Watson was appointed the first director of the observatory. He oversaw the completion of the original building, and also provided funding for a students' observatory, as well as a solar observatory. He died suddenly in 1880, never seeing the completed observatory. The instruments in the solar observatory, meant to be used in locating the hypothetical planet Vulcan, were removed in 1882. He was succeeded by Directors Edward S. Holden (1883-1886) then George C. Comstock (1886-1922). Alice Maxwell Lamb Updegraff and her husband Milton Updegraff both worked at the Washburn Observatory in the 1880s.

Joel Stebbins became the Director in 1922, and the observatory became a focus for pioneering work on photoelectric photometry as well as the study of variable stars and the interstellar reddening of starlight. He retired in 1948, being succeeded by Albert Whitford. The observatory was used quite heavily until the new Pine Bluff Observatory was dedicated in 1958. Whitford was instrumental in persuading the faculty to fund this new instrument. He left to become Director of Lick Observatory shortly after it was dedicated. Today Washburn Observatory is home to the University of Wisconsin-Madison College of Letters & Science Honors Program. The telescope, managed by the UW Department of Astronomy, is still used for public viewings and educational events.

== Images ==
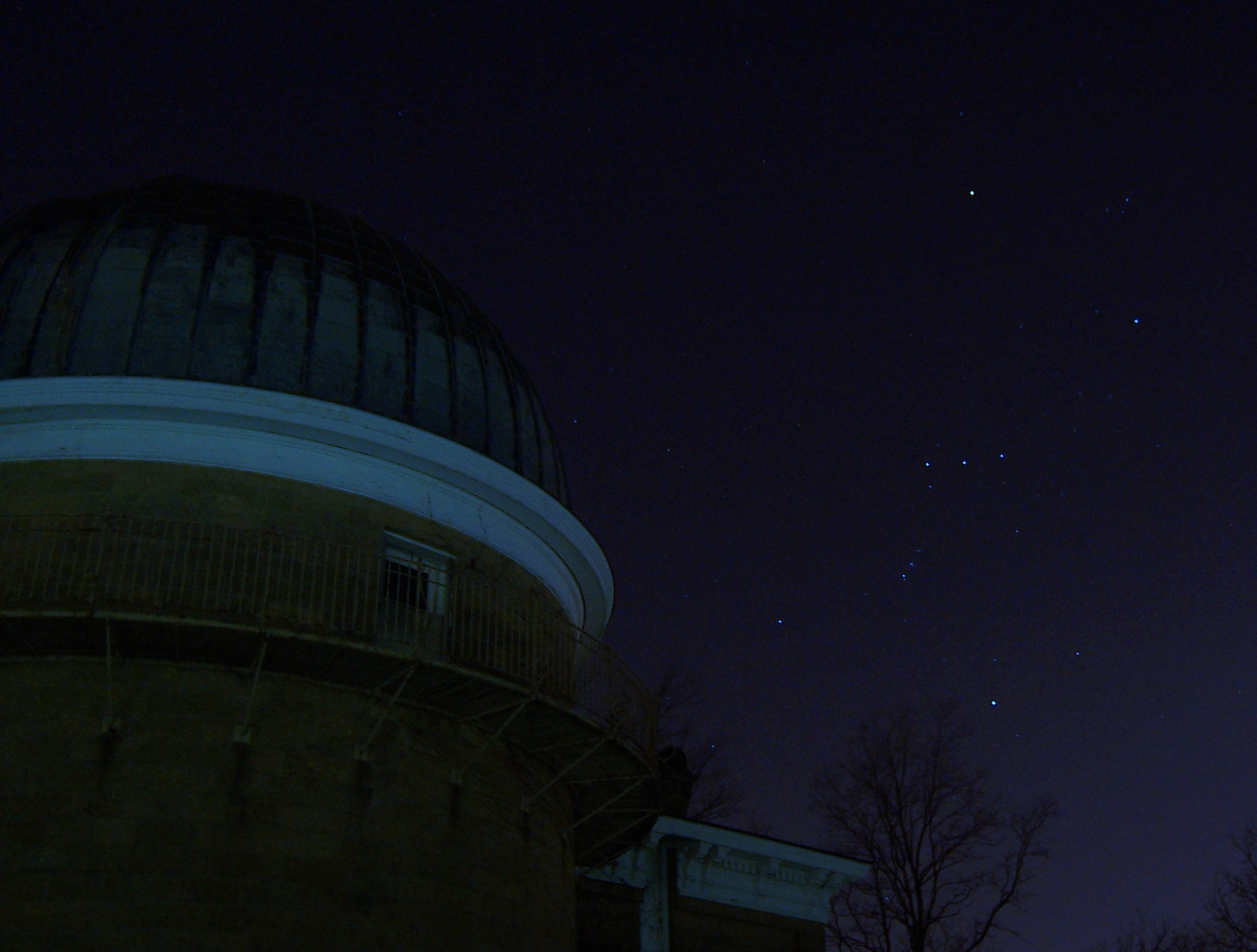
Observatory dome with the constellation Orion in the background.

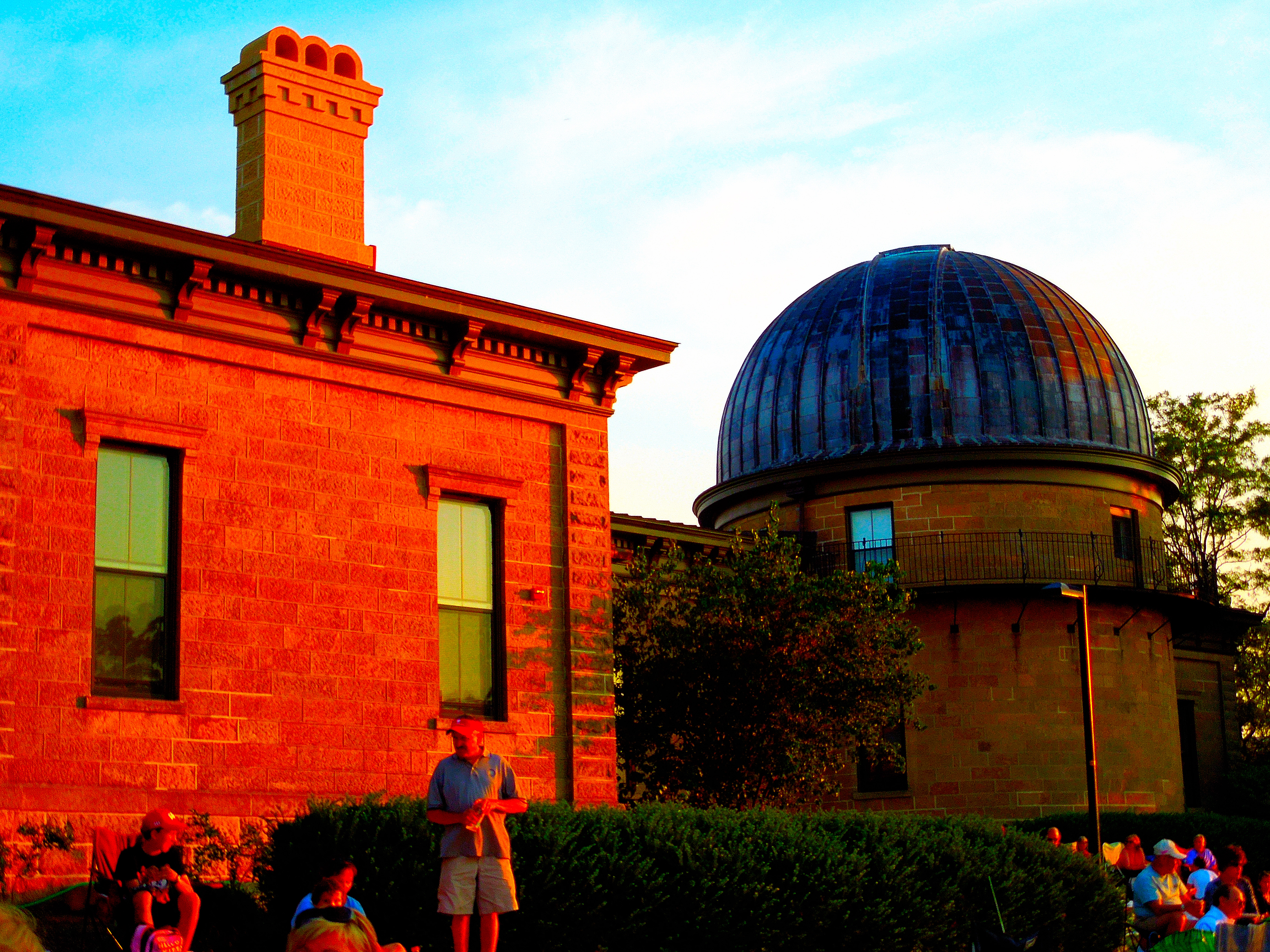
Observatory in the evening

== See also ==
- List of observatories
