= Boötes in Chinese astronomy =

Constellation in Chinese astronomy

The modern constellation Boötes lies across one of the quadrants symbolized by the Azure Dragon of the East (東方青龍, Dōng Fāng Qīng Lóng), and Three Enclosures (三垣, Sān Yuán), that divide the sky in traditional Chinese uranography.

The name of the western constellation in modern Chinese is 牧夫座 (mù fū zuò), meaning "the shepherd constellation".

== Star ==
The map of Chinese constellation in constellation Boötes area consists of :

Four Symbols	Mansion (Chinese name)	Romanization	Translation	Asterisms (Chinese name)	Romanization	Translation	Western star name	Proper Name	Chinese star name	Romanization	Translation
Three Enclosures (三垣)	紫微垣	Zǐ Wēi Yuán	Purple Forbidden enclosure	天槍	Tiānqiāng	Celestial Spear					
Three Enclosures (三垣)	紫微垣	Zǐ Wēi Yuán	Purple Forbidden enclosure	天槍	Tiānqiāng	Celestial Spear	κ Boo		天槍一	Tiānqiāngyī	1st star
Three Enclosures (三垣)	紫微垣	Zǐ Wēi Yuán	Purple Forbidden enclosure	天槍	Tiānqiāng	Celestial Spear	ι Boo		天槍二	Tiānqiāngèr	2nd star
Three Enclosures (三垣)	紫微垣	Zǐ Wēi Yuán	Purple Forbidden enclosure	天槍	Tiānqiāng	Celestial Spear	θ Boo				
Three Enclosures (三垣)	紫微垣	Zǐ Wēi Yuán	Purple Forbidden enclosure	天槍	Tiānqiāng	Celestial Spear	θ Boo		天槍三	Tiānqiāngsān	3rd star
Three Enclosures (三垣)	紫微垣	Zǐ Wēi Yuán	Purple Forbidden enclosure	天槍	Tiānqiāng	Celestial Spear	θ Boo		水位西星	Shuǐwèixīxīng	Star in the west of Water Level constellation
Three Enclosures (三垣)	紫微垣	Zǐ Wēi Yuán	Purple Forbidden enclosure	天槍	Tiānqiāng	Celestial Spear	13 Boo		天槍增一	Tiānqiāngzēngyī	1st additional star
Three Enclosures (三垣)	紫微垣	Zǐ Wēi Yuán	Purple Forbidden enclosure	天槍	Tiānqiāng	Celestial Spear	24 Boo		天槍增二	Tiānqiāngzēngèr	2nd additional star
Three Enclosures (三垣)	紫微垣	Zǐ Wēi Yuán	Purple Forbidden enclosure	天槍	Tiānqiāng	Celestial Spear	39 Boo		天槍增三	Tiānqiāngzēngsān	3rd additional star
Three Enclosures (三垣)	紫微垣	Zǐ Wēi Yuán	Purple Forbidden enclosure	天槍	Tiānqiāng	Celestial Spear	44 Boo	Quadrans (for component A)	天槍增四	Tiānqiāngzēngsì	4th additional star
Three Enclosures (三垣)	紫微垣	Zǐ Wēi Yuán	Purple Forbidden enclosure	玄戈	Xuángē	Sombre Lance					
Three Enclosures (三垣)	紫微垣	Zǐ Wēi Yuán	Purple Forbidden enclosure	玄戈	Xuángē	Sombre Lance	λ Boo	Xuange			
Three Enclosures (三垣)	紫微垣	Zǐ Wēi Yuán	Purple Forbidden enclosure	玄戈	Xuángē	Sombre Lance	λ Boo	Xuange	玄戈	Xuángē	(One star of)
Three Enclosures (三垣)	紫微垣	Zǐ Wēi Yuán	Purple Forbidden enclosure	玄戈	Xuángē	Sombre Lance	λ Boo	Xuange	元戈	Yuángē	Main lance (in the sky)
Three Enclosures (三垣)	紫微垣	Zǐ Wēi Yuán	Purple Forbidden enclosure	玄戈	Xuángē	Sombre Lance	λ Boo	Xuange	大鋒	Dàfēng	Big point of a spear
Three Enclosures (三垣)	紫微垣	Zǐ Wēi Yuán	Purple Forbidden enclosure	玄戈	Xuángē	Sombre Lance	λ Boo	Xuange	天戈	Tiāngē	Lance in the sky
Three Enclosures (三垣)	紫微垣	Zǐ Wēi Yuán	Purple Forbidden enclosure	玄戈	Xuángē	Sombre Lance	33 Boo		玄戈增一	Xuángēzēngyī	1st additional star
Three Enclosures (三垣)	紫微垣	Zǐ Wēi Yuán	Purple Forbidden enclosure	玄戈	Xuángē	Sombre Lance	38 Boo	Merga	玄戈增二	Xuángēzēngèr	2nd additional star
Three Enclosures (三垣)	太微垣	Tài Wēi Yuán	Supreme Palace enclosure	太微左垣	Tàiwēizuǒyuán	Left Wall					
Three Enclosures (三垣)	太微垣	Tài Wēi Yuán	Supreme Palace enclosure	太微左垣	Tàiwēizuǒyuán	Left Wall	HD 118840		東上將增三	Dōngshǎngjiāngzēngsān	3rd additional star of The First Eastern General
Three Enclosures (三垣)	太微垣	Tài Wēi Yuán	Supreme Palace enclosure	太微左垣	Tàiwēizuǒyuán	Left Wall	HD 118889		東上將增四	Dōngshǎngjiāngzēngsì	4th additional star of The First Eastern General
Three Enclosures (三垣)	天市垣	Tiān Shì Yuán	Heavenly Market enclosure	七公	Qīgōng	Seven Excellencies					
Three Enclosures (三垣)	天市垣	Tiān Shì Yuán	Heavenly Market enclosure	七公	Qīgōng	Seven Excellencies	ν^{1} Boo		七公五	Qīgōngwu	5th star
Three Enclosures (三垣)	天市垣	Tiān Shì Yuán	Heavenly Market enclosure	七公	Qīgōng	Seven Excellencies	μ^{1} Boo	Alkalurops	七公六	Qīgōngliù	6th star
Three Enclosures (三垣)	天市垣	Tiān Shì Yuán	Heavenly Market enclosure	七公	Qīgōng	Seven Excellencies	δ Boo	Qigong	七公七	Qīgōngqī	7th star
Three Enclosures (三垣)	天市垣	Tiān Shì Yuán	Heavenly Market enclosure	七公	Qīgōng	Seven Excellencies	β Boo	Nekkar	七公增五	Qīgōngzēngwǔ	5th additional star
Three Enclosures (三垣)	天市垣	Tiān Shì Yuán	Heavenly Market enclosure	七公	Qīgōng	Seven Excellencies	40 Boo		七公增六	Qīgōngzēngliù	6th additional star
Three Enclosures (三垣)	天市垣	Tiān Shì Yuán	Heavenly Market enclosure	七公	Qīgōng	Seven Excellencies	ν^{2} Boo		七公增九	Qīgōngzēngjiǔ	9th additional star
Three Enclosures (三垣)	天市垣	Tiān Shì Yuán	Heavenly Market enclosure	七公	Qīgōng	Seven Excellencies	φ Boo		七公增十	Qīgōngzēngshí	10th additional star
Three Enclosures (三垣)	天市垣	Tiān Shì Yuán	Heavenly Market enclosure	貫索	Guànsuǒ	Coiled Thong	χ Boo		貫索增一	Guànsuǒzēngyī	1st additional star
Azure Dragon of the East (東方青龍)	亢	Kàng	Neck	大角	Dàjiǎo	Great Horn					
Azure Dragon of the East (東方青龍)	亢	Kàng	Neck	大角	Dàjiǎo	Great Horn	α Boo	Arcturus			
Azure Dragon of the East (東方青龍)	亢	Kàng	Neck	大角	Dàjiǎo	Great Horn	α Boo	Arcturus	大角	Dàjiǎo	(One star of)
Azure Dragon of the East (東方青龍)	亢	Kàng	Neck	大角	Dàjiǎo	Great Horn	α Boo	Arcturus	大角星	Dàjiǎoxīng	Great Horn star
Azure Dragon of the East (東方青龍)	亢	Kàng	Neck	大角	Dàjiǎo	Great Horn	α Boo	Arcturus	梅雨星	Méiyǔxīng	Star of rainy season
Azure Dragon of the East (東方青龍)	亢	Kàng	Neck	大角	Dàjiǎo	Great Horn	α Boo	Arcturus	天棟	Tiāndòng	Celestial ridge-beam of a roof
Azure Dragon of the East (東方青龍)	亢	Kàng	Neck	大角	Dàjiǎo	Great Horn	α Boo	Arcturus	麦星	Màixīng	Star of wheat
Azure Dragon of the East (東方青龍)	亢	Kàng	Neck	大角	Dàjiǎo	Great Horn	α Boo	Arcturus	棟星	Dòngxīng	Star of ridge-beam of a roof
Azure Dragon of the East (東方青龍)	亢	Kàng	Neck	大角	Dàjiǎo	Great Horn	α Boo	Arcturus	天王座	Tiānwángzuò	Throne of celestial king
Azure Dragon of the East (東方青龍)	亢	Kàng	Neck	大角	Dàjiǎo	Great Horn	22 Boo		大角增一	Dàjiǎozēngyī	1st additional star
Azure Dragon of the East (東方青龍)	亢	Kàng	Neck	大角	Dàjiǎo	Great Horn	CN Boo		大角增二	Dàjiǎozēngèr	2nd additional star
Azure Dragon of the East (東方青龍)	亢	Kàng	Neck	左攝提	Zuǒnièdī	Left Conductor					
Azure Dragon of the East (東方青龍)	亢	Kàng	Neck	左攝提	Zuǒnièdī	Left Conductor	ο Boo		左攝提一	Zuǒnièdīyī	1st star
Azure Dragon of the East (東方青龍)	亢	Kàng	Neck	左攝提	Zuǒnièdī	Left Conductor	π^{1} Boo		左攝提二	Zuǒnièdīèr	2nd star
Azure Dragon of the East (東方青龍)	亢	Kàng	Neck	左攝提	Zuǒnièdī	Left Conductor	ζ Boo				
Azure Dragon of the East (東方青龍)	亢	Kàng	Neck	左攝提	Zuǒnièdī	Left Conductor	ζ Boo		左攝提三	Zuǒnièdīsān	3rd star
Azure Dragon of the East (東方青龍)	亢	Kàng	Neck	左攝提	Zuǒnièdī	Left Conductor	ζ Boo		南河东大星	Nánhédōngdàxīng	Big star in the east of South River constellation
Azure Dragon of the East (東方青龍)	亢	Kàng	Neck	左攝提	Zuǒnièdī	Left Conductor	ξ Boo		左攝提增一	Zuǒnièdīzēngyī	1st additional star
Azure Dragon of the East (東方青龍)	亢	Kàng	Neck	左攝提	Zuǒnièdī	Left Conductor	32 Boo		左攝提增二	Zuǒnièdīzēngyī	2nd additional star
Azure Dragon of the East (東方青龍)	亢	Kàng	Neck	左攝提	Zuǒnièdī	Left Conductor	31 Boo		左攝提增三	Zuǒnièdīzēngsān	3rd additional star
Azure Dragon of the East (東方青龍)	亢	Kàng	Neck	左攝提	Zuǒnièdī	Left Conductor	DE Boo		左攝提增四	Zuǒnièdīzēngsì	4th additional star
Azure Dragon of the East (東方青龍)	亢	Kàng	Neck	右攝提	Yòunièdī	Right Conductor					
Azure Dragon of the East (東方青龍)	亢	Kàng	Neck	右攝提	Yòunièdī	Right Conductor	η Boo	Muphrid			
Azure Dragon of the East (東方青龍)	亢	Kàng	Neck	右攝提	Yòunièdī	Right Conductor	η Boo	Muphrid	右攝提一	Yòunièdīyī	1st star
Azure Dragon of the East (東方青龍)	亢	Kàng	Neck	右攝提	Yòunièdī	Right Conductor	η Boo	Muphrid	右攝提上星	Yòunièdīhéshàngxīng	Superior star
Azure Dragon of the East (東方青龍)	亢	Kàng	Neck	右攝提	Yòunièdī	Right Conductor	τ Boo	Tepiamenit	右攝提二	Yòunièdīèr	2nd star
Azure Dragon of the East (東方青龍)	亢	Kàng	Neck	右攝提	Yòunièdī	Right Conductor	υ Boo		右攝提三	Yòunièdīsān	3rd star
Azure Dragon of the East (東方青龍)	亢	Kàng	Neck	右攝提	Yòunièdī	Right Conductor	6 Boo		右攝提增一	Yòunièdīzēngyī	1st additional star
Azure Dragon of the East (東方青龍)	亢	Kàng	Neck	右攝提	Yòunièdī	Right Conductor	2 Boo		右攝提增二	Yòunièdīzēngèr	2nd additional star
Azure Dragon of the East (東方青龍)	亢	Kàng	Neck	右攝提	Yòunièdī	Right Conductor	1 Boo		右攝提增三	Yòunièdīzēngsān	3rd additional star
Azure Dragon of the East (東方青龍)	亢	Kàng	Neck	右攝提	Yòunièdī	Right Conductor	HD 119584		右攝提增四	Yòunièdīzēngsì	4th additional star
Azure Dragon of the East (東方青龍)	亢	Kàng	Neck	右攝提	Yòunièdī	Right Conductor	7 Boo		右攝提增六	Yòunièdīzēngliù	6th additional star
Azure Dragon of the East (東方青龍)	氐	Dī	Root	招搖	Zhāoyáo	Twinkling Indicator					
Azure Dragon of the East (東方青龍)	氐	Dī	Root	招搖	Zhāoyáo	Twinkling Indicator	γ Boo	Seginus (for component A)			
Azure Dragon of the East (東方青龍)	氐	Dī	Root	招搖	Zhāoyáo	Twinkling Indicator	γ Boo	Seginus (for component A)	招搖	Zhāoyáo	(One star of)
Azure Dragon of the East (東方青龍)	氐	Dī	Root	招搖	Zhāoyáo	Twinkling Indicator	γ Boo	Seginus (for component A)	盾	Dùn	The shield
Azure Dragon of the East (東方青龍)	氐	Dī	Root	招搖	Zhāoyáo	Twinkling Indicator	γ Boo	Seginus (for component A)	矛楯	Máodùn	Spear and shield
Azure Dragon of the East (東方青龍)	氐	Dī	Root	梗河	Gěnghé	Celestial Lance	γ Boo	Seginus (for component A)			
Azure Dragon of the East (東方青龍)	氐	Dī	Root	梗河	Gěnghé	Celestial Lance	ε Boo	Izar (for component A), Pulcherrima (for component B)			
Azure Dragon of the East (東方青龍)	氐	Dī	Root	梗河	Gěnghé	Celestial Lance	ε Boo	Izar (for component A), Pulcherrima (for component B)	梗河一	Gěnghéyī	1st star
Azure Dragon of the East (東方青龍)	氐	Dī	Root	梗河	Gěnghé	Celestial Lance	ε Boo	Izar (for component A), Pulcherrima (for component B)	梗河东星	Gěnghédōngxīng	Eastern star
Azure Dragon of the East (東方青龍)	氐	Dī	Root	梗河	Gěnghé	Celestial Lance	σ Boo	Genghe	梗河二	Gěnghéèr	2nd star
Azure Dragon of the East (東方青龍)	氐	Dī	Root	梗河	Gěnghé	Celestial Lance	ρ Boo	Kalasungsang	梗河三	Gěnghésān	3rd star
Azure Dragon of the East (東方青龍)	氐	Dī	Root	梗河	Gěnghé	Celestial Lance	ψ Boo		梗河增一	Gěnghézēngyī	1st additional star
Azure Dragon of the East (東方青龍)	氐	Dī	Root	梗河	Gěnghé	Celestial Lance	46 Boo		梗河增二	Gěnghézēngèr	2nd additional star
Azure Dragon of the East (東方青龍)	氐	Dī	Root	梗河	Gěnghé	Celestial Lance	45 Boo		梗河增三	Gěnghézēngsān	3rd additional star
Azure Dragon of the East (東方青龍)	氐	Dī	Root	梗河	Gěnghé	Celestial Lance	ω Boo		梗河增四	Gěnghézēngsì	4th additional star
Azure Dragon of the East (東方青龍)	氐	Dī	Root	梗河	Gěnghé	Celestial Lance	W Boo	Alrumh	梗河增五	Gěnghézēngwǔ	5th additional star
Azure Dragon of the East (東方青龍)	氐	Dī	Root	帝席	Dìxí	Mattress of the Emperor					
Azure Dragon of the East (東方青龍)	氐	Dī	Root	帝席	Dìxí	Mattress of the Emperor	12 Boo		帝席一	Dìxíyī	1st star
Azure Dragon of the East (東方青龍)	氐	Dī	Root	帝席	Dìxí	Mattress of the Emperor	11 Boo		帝席二	Dìxíèr	2nd star
Azure Dragon of the East (東方青龍)	氐	Dī	Root	帝席	Dìxí	Mattress of the Emperor	9 Boo		帝席三	Dìxísān	3rd star
Azure Dragon of the East (東方青龍)	氐	Dī	Root	帝席	Dìxí	Mattress of the Emperor	3 Boo		帝席增一	Dìxízēngyī	1st additional star
Azure Dragon of the East (東方青龍)	氐	Dī	Root	亢池	Kàngchí	Boats and Lake					
Azure Dragon of the East (東方青龍)	氐	Dī	Root	亢池	Kàngchí	Boats and Lake	20 Boo		亢池一	Kàngchíyī	1st star
Azure Dragon of the East (東方青龍)	氐	Dī	Root	亢池	Kàngchí	Boats and Lake	HD 124034		亢池二	Kàngchíèr	2nd star
Azure Dragon of the East (東方青龍)	氐	Dī	Root	亢池	Kàngchí	Boats and Lake	14 Boo		亢池三	Kàngchísān	3rd star
Azure Dragon of the East (東方青龍)	氐	Dī	Root	亢池	Kàngchí	Boats and Lake	18 Boo		亢池四	Kàngchísì	4th star

== See also ==
- Traditional Chinese star names
- Chinese constellations
- List of constellations by area
