= 78 Ursae Majoris =

Binary star system in the constellation Ursa Major

- Location of 78 Ursae Majoris (circled in red)

Observation data Epoch J2000 Equinox ICRS
- Constellation: Ursa Major
- Right ascension: 13^{h} 00^{m} 43.69949^{s}
- Declination: +56° 21′ 58.8102″
- Apparent magnitude (V): 4.93 (5.02 + 7.88)

Characteristics
- Evolutionary stage: main sequence
- Spectral type: F2V + G6V
- U−B color index: +0.00
- B−V color index: +0.368±0.010

Astrometry
Radial velocity (R_{v})	−5.1±0.9 km/s
Proper motion (μ)	RA: 107.94 mas/yr Dec.: 2.05 mas/yr
Parallax (π)	39.30±0.38 mas
Distance	83.0 ± 0.8 ly (25.4 ± 0.2 pc)
Absolute magnitude (M_{V})	+2.84

Orbit
Period (P)	104.9±0.6 yr
Semi-major axis (a)	1.208±0.010″
Eccentricity (e)	0.388±0.009
Inclination (i)	46.9±0.9°
Longitude of the node (Ω)	88.0±1.1°
Periastron epoch (T)	B 1921.224±0.403
Argument of periastron (ω) (secondary)	119.2±1.5°

Details

78 UMa A
Mass	1.34 M_{☉}
Radius	1.62±0.24 R_{☉}
Luminosity	5.75 L_{☉}
Surface gravity (log g)	4.26±0.14 cgs
Temperature	6,908±235 K
Metallicity [Fe/H]	0.01±0.05 dex
Rotation	19.2 ± 2.9 h
Rotational velocity (v sin i)	91.7±4.6 km/s
Age	785 Myr

Other designations
- 78 UMa, BD+57°1408, HD 113139, HIP 63503, HR 4931, SAO 28601, WDS J13007+5622

Database references
SIMBAD	The system
- A
- B

78 Ursae Majoris is a binary star system in the northern circumpolar constellation of Ursa Major. It is visible to the naked eye as a faint point of light with a combined apparent visual magnitude of 4.93. Parallax estimates by Hipparcos put it at a distance of 83 light-years (25 pc), but it is drifting closer with a radial velocity of −5 km/s. The system is a candidate member of the Ursa Major Moving Group.

The binary nature of this system was announced by S. W. Burnham in 1894. The pair orbit each other with a period of 105 years and an eccentricity of 0.39. Their semimajor axis has an angular size of 1.2″ and the orbital plane is inclined by 47°.

The primary member, designated component A, has a magnitude of 5.02 and is an F-type main-sequence star with a stellar classification of F2V. It is 785 million years old and is spinning with a projected rotational velocity of 92 km/s. The star has 1.34 times the mass of the Sun and is radiating 5.75 times the Sun's luminosity from its photosphere at an effective temperature of 6,908 K.

The secondary, designated component B, has a visual magnitude of 7.88. It is a G-type main-sequence star with a class of G6V. The star is a suspected variable.
