= Psi Boötis =

Star in the constellation of Bootes

- Location of ψ Boötis (circled in red)

Observation data Epoch J2000.0 Equinox J2000.0 (ICRS)
- Constellation: Boötes
- Right ascension: 15^{h} 04^{m} 26.743^{s}
- Declination: +26° 56′ 51.53″
- Apparent magnitude (V): +4.55

Characteristics
- Evolutionary stage: red clump
- Spectral type: K2 III
- U−B color index: +1.34
- B−V color index: +1.23

Astrometry
Radial velocity (R_{v})	−25.72±0.18 km/s
Proper motion (μ)	RA: −174.718 mas/yr Dec.: −5.036 mas/yr
Parallax (π)	12.6144±0.0896 mas
Distance	259 ± 2 ly (79.3 ± 0.6 pc)
Absolute magnitude (M_{V})	+0.16

Details
Mass	1.38 M_{☉}
Radius	20 R_{☉}
Luminosity	135 L_{☉}
Surface gravity (log g)	2.2 cgs
Temperature	4,302±22 K
Metallicity [Fe/H]	−0.35 dex
Rotational velocity (v sin i)	3.5 km/s
Age	4.16 Gyr

Other designations
- Aulad al Nathlat, ψ Boo, 43 Boötis, BD+27°2447, FK5 557, GC 20285, HD 133582, HIP 73745, HR 5616, SAO 83645

Database references
SIMBAD	data

Psi Boötis is a single, orange-hued star in the northern constellation of Boötes. Its name is a Bayer designation that is Latinized from ψ Boötis, and abbreviated Psi Boo or ψ Boo. This is a dim star that is visible to the naked eye with an apparent visual magnitude of +4.55. Based upon an annual parallax shift of 12.6 mas as seen from the Earth, it is located about 259 light-years (79 pc) from the Sun. At that distance, the visual magnitude is diminished by an extinction of 0.09 due to interstellar dust. It is traversing the sky with a net proper motion of 0.176 arc seconds per year, and has a radial velocity toward the Sun of −25.72 km/s.

This star has a stellar classification of K2 III, matching an evolved K-type giant star. It belongs to the so-called red clump, indicating that it is generating energy through helium fusion at its core. This star is about four billion years old and is spinning with a projected rotational velocity of 3.5 km/s. It has an estimated 1.38 times the mass of the Sun and has expanded to 20 times the Sun's radius. Psi Boötis radiating 135 times the Sun's luminosity from its enlarged photosphere at an effective temperature of 4,302 K.

== Name ==
This star, according to Assemani, with another in the right arm that may have been ε Boo (Izar), constituted the Arabs' Al Aulād al Nadhlāt, which he rendered filii altercationis (sons of contention); but the original signifies "the Low, or Mean, Little Ones".

Al Aulād al Nadhlāt or Aulad al Nathlat was the title of this star in the catalogue of stars in Technical Memorandum 33-507 - A Reduced Star Catalog Containing 537 Named Stars.
