= 46 Boötis =

Star in the constellation Boötes

Observation data Epoch J2000 Equinox ICRS
- Constellation: Boötes
- Right ascension: 15^{h} 08^{m} 23.78241^{s}
- Declination: +26° 18′ 04.1464″
- Apparent magnitude (V): 5.67

Characteristics
- Spectral type: K2 III
- U−B color index: +1.24
- B−V color index: +1.240±0.015

Astrometry
Radial velocity (R_{v})	+19.31±0.30 km/s
Proper motion (μ)	RA: +4.454 mas/yr Dec.: −15.185 mas/yr
Parallax (π)	6.8288±0.0883 mas
Distance	478 ± 6 ly (146 ± 2 pc)
Absolute magnitude (M_{V})	−0.31

Orbit
Period (P)	2,567.1±0.6 d
Semi-major axis (a)	11.2 mas
Eccentricity (e)	0.8315±0.0027
Inclination (i)	62°
Longitude of the node (Ω)	82.6±6.6°
Periastron epoch (T)	2,448,356.6 JD
Argument of periastron (ω) (secondary)	175.3±0.7°
Semi-amplitude (K_{1}) (primary)	9.25±0.10 km/s

Details

46 Boo A
Radius	23.35+0.85 −0.67 R_{☉}
Luminosity	175.8±2.8 L_{☉}
Temperature	4,349+64 −76 K
Metallicity [Fe/H]	−0.27±0.15 dex

Other designations
- b Boo, 46 Boo, BD+26°2656, FK5 1396, GC 20367, HD 134320, HIP 74087, HR 5638, SAO 83682

Database references
SIMBAD	data

46 Boötis is a binary star system in the northern constellation of Boötes, located mid-way between α Coronae Borealis and ε Boötis. It has the Bayer designation b Boötis; 46 Boötis is the Flamsteed designation. The system lies 478 light-years away from the Sun based on parallax, and is visible to the naked eye as a faint, orange-hued star with a combined apparent visual magnitude of 5.67. It is moving away from the Earth with a heliocentric radial velocity of +19 km/s. The light from this system displays an unusually high level of polarization due to interstellar dust.

This is a single-lined spectroscopic binary with an orbital period of 7.03 years and a large eccentricity of 0.83. The primary member, designated component A, is an aging giant star with a stellar classification of K2 III. As a consequence of exhausting the hydrogen at its core, it has expanded to 23 times the Sun's radius. It is radiating 176 times the luminosity of the Sun from its enlarged photosphere at an effective temperature of 4,349 K. The companion star, component B, is most likely a lower main-sequence star with 0.6–0.8 times the Sun's mass.
