= CN Boötis =

Am star in the constellation Boötes

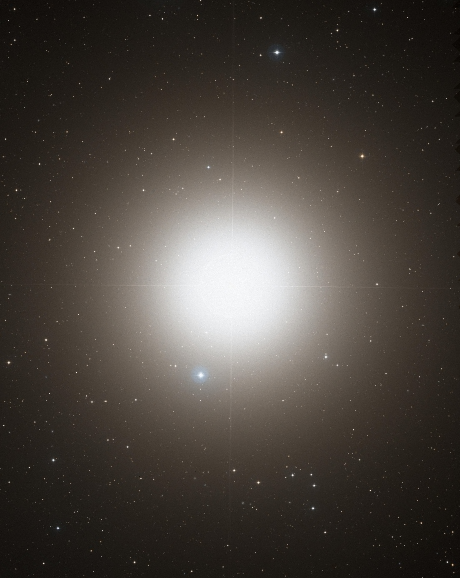
- Location of CN Boötis (circled), seen in an optical image of Arcturus (bright star at center).

Observation data Epoch J2000 Equinox ICRS
- Constellation: Boötes
- Right ascension: 14^{h} 16^{m} 04.13970^{s}
- Declination: +18° 54′ 42.4852″
- Apparent magnitude (V): 5.96

Characteristics
- Evolutionary stage: main sequence
- Spectral type: A8V
- U−B color index: +0.05
- B−V color index: +0.26
- Variable type: δ Sct

Astrometry
| Radial velocity (R_{v}) | 4.69±0.18 km/s |
| Proper motion (μ) | RA: 40.288 mas/yr Dec.: -30.863 mas/yr |
| Parallax (π) | 21.6479±0.0332 mas |
| Distance | 150.7 ± 0.2 ly (46.19 ± 0.07 pc) |

Details

CN Boötis
| Mass | 1.552±0.122 M_{☉} |
| Radius | 1.603±0.108 R_{☉} |
| Luminosity | 6.80±0.197 L_{☉} |
| Surface gravity (log g) | 4.38 cgs |
| Temperature | 7388 K |
| Rotational velocity (v sin i) | 82 km/s |

Other designations
- AG+19°1338, BD+19°2779, GC 19251, HD 124953, HR 5343, SAO 100949, PPM 130449, TIC 135169898, TYC 1472-1427-1, GSC 01472-01427, 2MASS J14160414+1854426, Gaia DR3 1233902704963092608

Database references
| SIMBAD | CN Boo |

CN Boötis (HD 124953, HR 5343), or simply CN Boo, is a white-hued variable star in the northern constellation of Boötes. With an apparent magnitude of 5.957, it can be faintly seen from Earth by the naked eye, just south-southeast of the much brighter Arcturus. It is located at a distance of 150.7 light-years (46.2 parsecs) according to Gaia DR3 parallax measurements, and is receding at a radial velocity of 4.69±0.18 km/s. It is a member of the Ursa Major Stream, a group of stars with similar velocities that all formed around 300 million years ago.

It was given its variable star designation, CN Boötis, in 1981. Prior to that it was usually referred to as HR 5343 or HD 124953 in the literature.

== Stellar characteristics ==
CN Boo is a late A-type star with an effective temperature of 7,388 K (7,115 °C; 12,839 °F), and has been classified as either a main-sequence star (spectral type A8V/A9V) or a giant star (spectral type A8III). A 2023 estimate places its radius at a modest 1.6 R_{☉}, which seems to suggest the former.

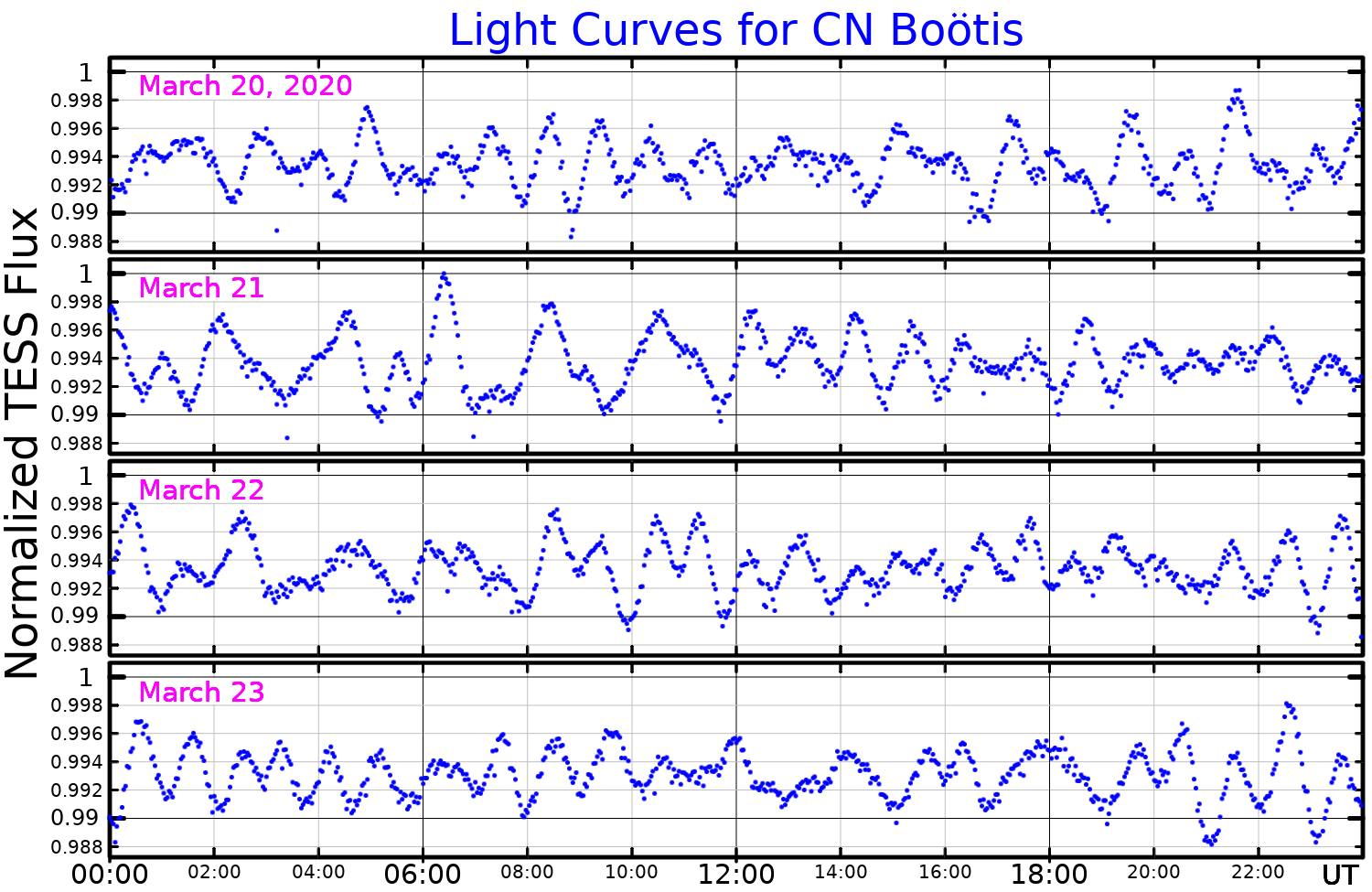
Light curves for CN Boötis, plotted from TESS data.

The star has been known to be an Am star since at least 1964, when the Bright Star Catalogue classified it as such. It was first discovered to be a δ Scuti variable in 1979 by Costa et al., with a period of 0.04 days (58 minutes) and an amplitude of 0.03 mag. This went against the notion that main-sequence Am stars do not pulsate, something that was accepted as fact at the time, so the team considered the Am classification to be erroneous. A more recent study, however, accepts CN Boo as a pulsating Am star, since it shows a metal abundance pattern archetypal of Am stars, and has a minimum rotation speed (82 km/s) that allows for diffusion processes that cause Am characteristics.

In 1991, CN Boo was found to be a soft X-ray source, meaning that the X-rays it emits are of lower energies, i.e., longer wavelengths. It radiates energy at a rate of 2×10^{28} erg/s in X-rays, chiefly at an energy range of below 0.5 keV (wavelength >2.48 nm).

== Possible companion ==
The 1991 edition of the Bright Star Catalogue lists CN Boo as a potential spectroscopic binary. A 2008 study, however, did not detect significant radial velocity variations or any signals of the companion star in the spectrum of CN Boo, meaning that if a secondary star exists, it likely has a flux below 5% that of the primary star.
