= HD 27022 =

Star in the constellation Camelopardalis

- Location of HD 27022 on the map (circled)

Observation data Epoch J2000.0 Equinox J2000.0 (ICRS)
- Constellation: Camelopardalis
- Right ascension: 04^{h} 20^{m} 40.32564^{s}
- Declination: +65° 08′ 25.5893″
- Apparent magnitude (V): +5.27

Characteristics
- Spectral type: G4 III or G5 IIb
- U−B color index: +0.47
- B−V color index: +0.81

Astrometry
Radial velocity (R_{v})	−19.47±0.21 km/s
Proper motion (μ)	RA: −28.439 mas/yr Dec.: −4.4856 mas/yr
Parallax (π)	9.4068±0.0643 mas
Distance	347 ± 2 ly (106.3 ± 0.7 pc)
Absolute magnitude (M_{V})	+0.31

Details
Mass	2.88 M_{☉}
Radius	10.71+0.23 −1.06 R_{☉}
Luminosity	75.9 L_{☉}
Surface gravity (log g)	3.10±0.21 cgs
Temperature	5,425±33 K
Metallicity [Fe/H]	0.03±0.05 dex
Rotational velocity (v sin i)	0.5±1.4 km/s
Age	444±60 Myr

Other designations
- 20 H. Camelopardalis, AG+65°247, BD+64°433, FK5 2315, GC 5199, HD 27022, HIP 20266, HR 1327, SAO 13098

Database references
SIMBAD	data

HD 27022, also known as HR 1327, is a star located in the northern circumpolar constellation Camelopardalis. The object has also been designated as 20 H. Camelopardalis, but is not commonly used in modern times. It has an apparent magnitude of 5.27, allowing it to be faintly visible to the naked eye. Based on parallax measurements from Gaia DR3, the star has been estimated to be 347 light years away. It appears to be approaching the Solar System, having a heliocentric radial velocity of −19.5 km/s.

This is a solitary, yellow giant with a stellar classification of G4 III. It has alternatively been classified as G5 IIb wk, indicating a bright giant with weak lines. HD 27022 is currently on the horizontal branch located on the warm end of the red clump, a region of the said branch filled with metal-rich giant stars. It has 2.88 times the mass of the Sun but at the age of 444 million years, it has expanded to 10.71 times its girth. It radiates 75.9 times the luminosity of the Sun from its enlarged photosphere at an effective temperature of 5,425 K. Like most giants, it spins rather slowly, having a projected rotational velocity of 1/2 km/s. Kinematically, it belongs to the halo of the Ursa Major moving group.
