= HD 165185 =

Star in the constellation Sagittarius

- Location of HD 165185 (circled in red)

Observation data Epoch J2000 Equinox ICRS
- Constellation: Sagittarius
- Right ascension: 18^{h} 06^{m} 23.720^{s}
- Declination: −36° 01′ 11.23″
- Apparent magnitude (V): 5.94

Characteristics
- Evolutionary stage: main sequence
- Spectral type: G1 V
- U−B color index: 0.07
- B−V color index: 0.61

Astrometry
Radial velocity (R_{v})	+15.4 km/s
Proper motion (μ)	RA: +106.020 mas/yr Dec.: +8.812 mas/yr
Parallax (π)	58.4296±0.0404 mas
Distance	55.82 ± 0.04 ly (17.11 ± 0.01 pc)
Absolute magnitude (M_{V})	+4.59

Details
Mass	1.13 M_{☉}
Radius	0.94 R_{☉}
Luminosity (bolometric)	1.15 L_{☉}
Surface gravity (log g)	4.46±0.06 cgs
Temperature	5,940±18 K
Metallicity [Fe/H]	−0.05±0.03 dex
Rotation	5.90 days
Rotational velocity (v sin i)	7.53 km/s
Age	437±186 Myr

Other designations
- 29 G. Sgr, CD−36°12214, GJ 702.1, HD 165185, HIP 88694, HR 6748, SAO 209710, WDS J18064-3601A

Database references
SIMBAD	data
ARICNS	data

HD 165185 is the Henry Draper Catalogue designation for a star in the southern zodiac constellation of Sagittarius. It has an apparent visual magnitude of 5.94, which indicates it is a sixth magnitude star that is faintly visible to the naked eye. (According to the Bortle scale, it can be viewed from dark suburban skies.) Parallax measurements give an estimated distance of 55.8 light years from the Sun. It is drifting further away with a heliocentric radial velocity of +15.4 km/s.

This star is a pre-main-sequence solar analog with a stellar classification of G1 V. It is spinning with a projected rotational velocity of 7.53 km/s and a rotation period of 5.9 days. Measurements of magnetic activity in the chromosphere show variations over time, much like the sunspot cycle. This activity showed a distinct peak in 2009. Stellar models give an estimated mass equal to 1.13 times the mass of the Sun, but only 94% of the Sun's radius. The total, or bolometric luminosity of the star is 15% higher than the Sun, while the abundance of elements other than hydrogen and helium—what astronomer's term the metallicity—is nearly the same as in the Sun. The stellar atmosphere has an effective temperature of 5,940 K, giving it the yellow-hued glow of a G-type star.

HD 165185 completed its perihelion passage some 851,000 years ago when it came within 29 ly (8.9 pc) of the Sun, and it is now moving away with a radial velocity component of 15.4 km/s. Based upon the motion of this star through space, its age, and properties, this star is a probable member of the Ursa Major Moving Group; a stellar kinematic group that formed in the same region of space. It has a suspected common proper motion companion at an angular separation of 12″, corresponding to a projected separation of 220 AU. This is a red dwarf star with a stellar classification of M0 and an infrared K band magnitude of 8.11.
