= 32 Boötis =

Star in the constellation Boötes

Observation data Epoch J2000 Equinox ICRS
- Constellation: Boötes
- Right ascension: 14^{h} 41^{m} 43.52071^{s}
- Declination: +11° 39′ 38.3820″
- Apparent magnitude (V): 5.55

Characteristics
- Evolutionary stage: red clump
- Spectral type: G8 III
- B−V color index: 0.941±0.002

Astrometry
| Radial velocity (R_{v}) | −23.3±0.3 km/s |
| Proper motion (μ) | RA: −159.787 mas/yr Dec.: −112.732 mas/yr |
| Parallax (π) | 9.0120±0.2578 mas |
| Distance | 360 ± 10 ly (111 ± 3 pc) |
| Absolute magnitude (M_{V}) | 0.09 |

Details
| Mass | 2.15 M_{☉} |
| Radius | 12.06+0.09 −0.24 R_{☉} |
| Luminosity | 79.14±2.57 L_{☉} |
| Surface gravity (log g) | 2.6±0.3 cgs |
| Temperature | 4,957.5+50.0 −17.5 K |
| Metallicity [Fe/H] | −23.3±0.3 dex |
| Rotational velocity (v sin i) | 2.6 km/s |
| Age | 1.46 Gyr |

Other designations
- 32 Boo, BD+12°2729, FK5 1382, HD 129336, HIP 71837, HR 5481, SAO 120601, LTT 14344

Database references
| SIMBAD | data |

32 Boötis is a single star in the northern constellation of Boötes, located 360 light years away from the Sun. It is visible to the naked eye as a faint, yellow-hued star with an apparent visual magnitude of 5.55. This object is moving closer to the Earth with a heliocentric radial velocity of −23 km/s. It has a relatively high proper motion, traversing the celestial sphere at the rate of 0.195 arc seconds per annum.

This is an aging giant star with a stellar classification of G8 III. It is most likely on the horizontal branch and is a candidate red clump giant. The star is an estimated 1.46 billion years old with 2.15 times the mass of the Sun. With the hydrogen at its core exhausted, it has expanded to 12 times the Sun's radius. 32 Boötis is radiating 79 times the luminosity of the Sun from its swollen photosphere at an effective temperature of 4958 K.
