= 38 Boötis =

Star in the constellation Boötes

- Location of 38 Boötis (circled in red)

Observation data Epoch J2000 Equinox ICRS
- Constellation: Boötes
- Right ascension: 14^{h} 49^{m} 18.67062^{s}
- Declination: +46° 06′ 58.3369″
- Apparent magnitude (V): 5.76

Characteristics
- Evolutionary stage: subgiant
- Spectral type: F6 IVs
- B−V color index: 0.482±0.002

Astrometry
Radial velocity (R_{v})	−4.5±0.2 km/s
Proper motion (μ)	RA: −6.404 mas/yr Dec.: −78.073 mas/yr
Parallax (π)	20.7166±0.0638 mas
Distance	157.4 ± 0.5 ly (48.3 ± 0.1 pc)
Absolute magnitude (M_{V})	2.31

Details
Mass	1.60±0.04 M_{☉}
Radius	2.51+0.04 −0.08 R_{☉}
Luminosity	9.511±0.039 L_{☉}
Surface gravity (log g)	3.92±0.02 cgs
Temperature	6,591±63 K
Metallicity [Fe/H]	0.11±0.05 dex
Rotational velocity (v sin i)	9.8 km/s
Age	1.74+0.19 −0.10 Gyr

Other designations
- Merga, Marrha, El Mara el Musalsela, Falx Italica, h Boötis, 38 Boo, BD+46°1993, FK5 1383, GC 19959, HD 130945, HIP 72487, HR 5533, SAO 45226

Database references
SIMBAD	data

38 Boötis is a single star in the northern constellation of Boötes, located approximately 157 light years from the Sun. It has the traditional name Merga /ˈmɜːrɡə/ and the Bayer designation h Boötis; 38 Boötis is the star's Flamsteed designation. This object is visible to the naked eye as a dim, yellow-white hued star with an apparent visual magnitude of 5.76. It is moving closer to the Earth with a heliocentric radial velocity of −4.5 km/s.

This is a sharp-lined ('s') subgiant star with a stellar classification of F6 IVs, which indicates it has consumed the hydrogen at its core and is evolving off the main sequence. It is about 1.7 billion years old and is spinning with a relatively low projected rotational velocity of 10 km/s, as indicated by the sharp lines. The star has 1.6 times the mass of the Sun and 2.5 times the Sun's radius. It is radiating 9.5 times the luminosity of the Sun from its photosphere at an effective temperature of 6,591 K.

== Nomenclature ==
It has the traditional name Merga, occasionally spelled Marrha or in full El Mara el Musalsela, from the Arabic المرأة المسلسلة al-mar'ah al-musalsalah "the chained woman". Another occasional name was Falx Italica, from the Latin falx ītalica "billhook". In 2016, the International Astronomical Union organized a Working Group on Star Names (WGSN) to catalogue and standardize proper names for stars. The WGSN approved the name Merga for this star on 12 September 2016 and it is now so included in the List of IAU-approved Star Names.
