= Lambda Boötis =

Star in the constellation Boötes

λ Boötis
- Location of λ Boötis (circled)

Observation data Epoch J2000.0 Equinox ICRS
- Constellation: Boötes
- Right ascension: 14^{h} 16^{m} 23.018^{s}
- Declination: +46° 05′ 17.90″
- Apparent magnitude (V): +4.18

Characteristics
- Evolutionary stage: main sequence
- Spectral type: A0p λB
- U−B color index: +0.05
- B−V color index: +0.08
- Variable type: δ Sct

Astrometry
| Radial velocity (R_{v}) | −7.9±1.6 km/s |
| Proper motion (μ) | RA: −187.698 mas/yr Dec.: 159.309 mas/yr |
| Parallax (π) | 32.5885±0.1410 mas |
| Distance | 100.1 ± 0.4 ly (30.7 ± 0.1 pc) |
| Absolute magnitude (M_{V}) | +1.71±0.23 |

Details
| Mass | 1.66+0.19 −0.16 M_{☉} |
| Radius | 1.70±0.10 R_{☉} |
| Luminosity | 16.3±0.6 L_{☉} |
| Surface gravity (log g) | 4.188 cgs |
| Temperature | 8,887±242 K |
| Rotational velocity (v sin i) | 100 km/s |
| Age | 2.8+1.1 −0.8 Gyr |

Other designations
- Xuange, λ Boo, 19 Boötis, BD+46°1949, FK5 527, GC 19273, GJ 3837, HD 125162, HIP 69732, HR 5351, SAO 44965

Database references
| SIMBAD | data |

Lambda Boötis is a star in the northern constellation of Boötes. Its name is a Bayer designation that is Latinized from λ Boötis, and abbreviated Lam Boo or λ Boo. It has the official name Xuange, pronounced /ˈʃwɛnɡə/. With an apparent visual magnitude of +4.18, it is faintly visible to the naked eye. Based on parallax measurements, it is 100.1 light-years (30.7 pc) distant from Earth. This star is drifting closer to the Sun with a radial velocity of −8 km/s.

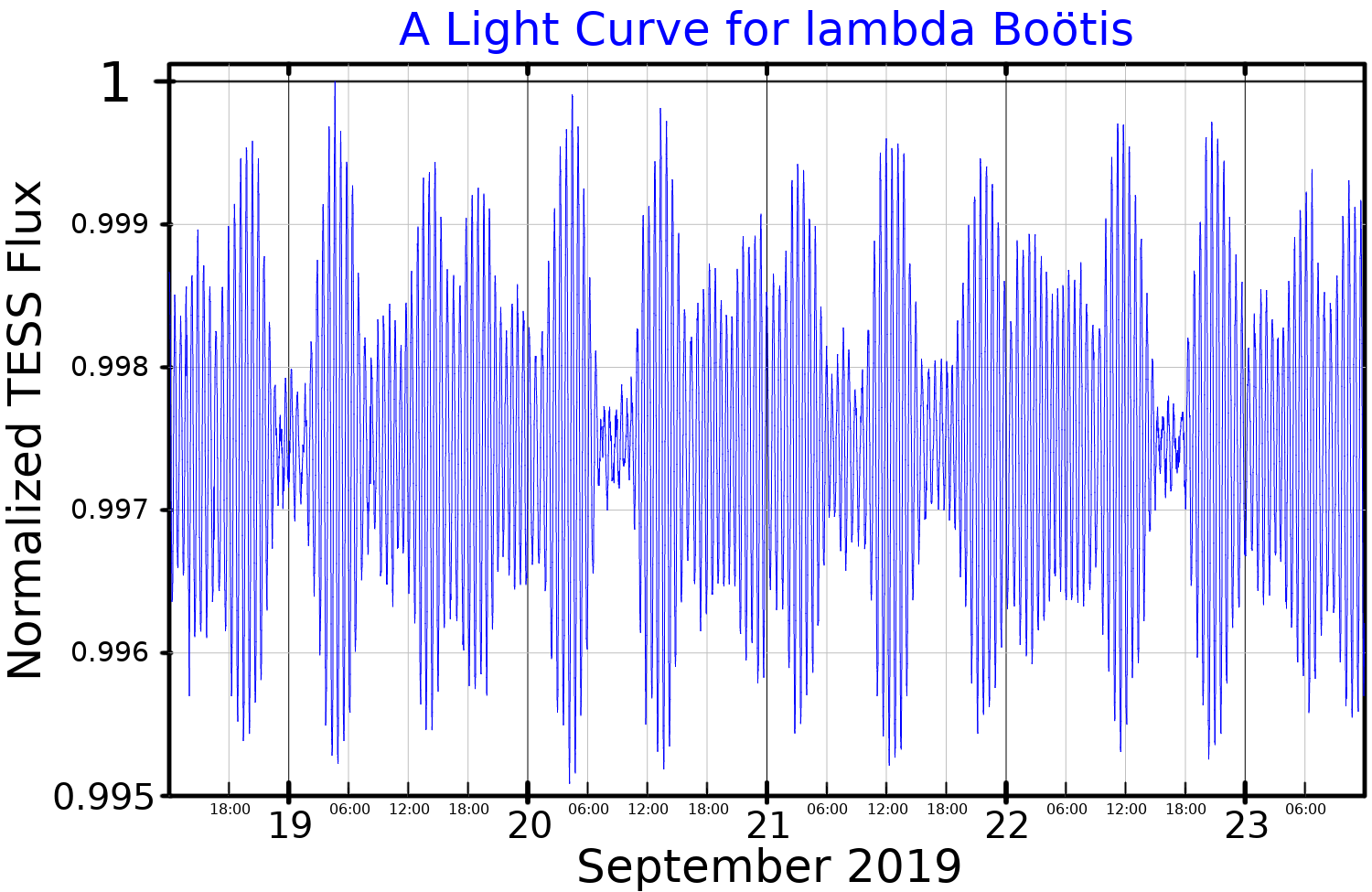
A light curve for Lambda Boötis, plotted from TESS data

This is a white hued A-type main-sequence star with a stellar classification of A0p λB. It is the prototype of a group of rare stars known as Lambda Boötis stars, all of which are dwarf stars with unusually low abundances of metals in their spectra. Its diameter has been directly measured to be 1.7 times that of the Sun. This is a Delta Scuti variable star with a period of 33.1 minutes and an amplitude of 0.0020 in visual magnitude.

This star displays an infrared excess that may be the result of a circumstellar disk of orbiting debris, or else a bow wave from its motion through the interstellar medium.

== Nomenclature ==
λ Boötis (Latinised to Lambda Boötis) is the star's Bayer designation.

In Chinese astronomy, Lambda Boötis is called 玄戈, Pinyin: Xuángē, meaning 'sombre lance', because this star is marking itself and standing alone in the Sombre Lance asterism, Purple Forbidden enclosure (see : Chinese constellations). 玄戈 (Xuángē) westernized into Heuen Ko, but that name was assigned to Gamma Boötis by R. H. Allen, with the meaning of 'the heavenly spear'. In 2016, the IAU organized a Working Group on Star Names (WGSN) to catalog and standardize proper names for stars. The WGSN approved the name Xuange for Lambda Boötis on 30 June 2017 and it is now so included in the List of IAU-approved Star Names.

This star, along with the Aselli (Theta Boötis, Iota Boötis and Kappa Boötis), were Al Aulād al Dhiʼbah (ألعولد ألذعب - al aulād al dhiʼb), "the Whelps of the Hyenas". Al Aulād al Dhiʼbah or Aulad al Thiba was the title of this star in a 1971 NASA memorandum.
