= Sigma Boötis =

Star in the constellation Boötes

σ Boötis
- Location of σ Boötes (circled)

Observation data Epoch J2000 Equinox ICRS
- Constellation: Boötes
- Right ascension: 14^{h} 34^{m} 40.817^{s}
- Declination: +29° 44′ 42.48″
- Apparent magnitude (V): 4.46

Characteristics
- Evolutionary stage: main sequence
- Spectral type: F4VkF2mF1
- U−B color index: −0.084
- B−V color index: +0.366
- Variable type: Suspected

Astrometry
Radial velocity (R_{v})	+0.37±0.09 km/s
Proper motion (μ)	RA: +188.574 mas/yr Dec.: +131.580 mas/yr
Parallax (π)	63.4679±0.1173 mas
Distance	51.39 ± 0.09 ly (15.76 ± 0.03 pc)
Absolute magnitude (M_{V})	3.52

Details
Mass	1.48 M_{☉} 1.18 M_{☉}
Radius	1.431±0.023 R_{☉}
Luminosity	3.461±0.042 L_{☉}
Surface gravity (log g)	4.30 cgs
Temperature	6,594±55 K
Metallicity [Fe/H]	−0.24 dex
Rotation	8.4±0.2 d
Rotational velocity (v sin i)	3.8±0.3 km/s
Age	1.7 Gyr; 2.42 Gyr; 3.1 Gyr

Other designations
- Genghe, σ Boo, 28 Boötis, BD+30°2536, GC 19659, GJ 557, HD 128167, HIP 71284, HR 5447, SAO 83416, PPM 103421, CCDM 14347+2945, WDS J14347+2945A

Database references
SIMBAD	data

Sigma Boötis, also named Genghe, is a single, yellow-hued star in the northern constellation of Boötes. This star is visible to the naked eye with an apparent visual magnitude of 4.46. Located to the southeast of Rho Boötis, the dwarf Sigma may at first appear as a naked-eye double, but the angular proximity with Rho is merely line-of-sight. Sigma Boötis is located at a distance of 51.4 light-years (16 pc) from the Sun based on parallax. The star has a relatively high proper motion and is traversing the sky at the rate of 0.230″ yr^{−1}.

== Nomenclature ==
Sigma Boötis is a Bayer designation that is Latinized from σ Boötis, and abbreviated Sigma Boo or σ Boo. It is known by several other catalog designations, including 28 Boötis, BD+30°2536, GC 19659, GJ 557, HD 128167, HIP 71284, HR 5447, SAO 83416, and CCDM 14347+2945.

In Chinese astronomy, 梗河 (Gěng Hé), meaning Celestial Lance, refers to an asterism consisting of σ Boötis, ε Boötis and ρ Boötis. Consequently, the Chinese name for σ Boötis itself is 梗河二 (Gěng Hé èr, English: the Second Star of Celestial Lance). The IAU Working Group on Star Names approved the name Genghe for this star on 15 April 2026, after the Chinese asterism.

== Properties ==
The stellar classification of Sigma Boötis is F4VkF2mF1. This notation is used for so-called "metal-weak" stars; Am stars with absorption lines of some metals weaker than expected in comparison with other spectral features. The 'F4V', indicating an F-type main-sequence star, is derived from the hydrogen spectral lines and the shape of the metallic lines, the 'kF2' means it has the Calcium K line strength of a hotter F2 star and 'mF1' showing it has the metallic line strength of an F1 star. It is around twice as luminous as a comparable zero age main sequence star, which may indicate it is near the end of its main sequence lifetime.

Sigma Boötis is a solar-type star but is larger and more massive than the Sun. It has an estimated age of around two to three billion years and is spinning with a projected rotational velocity of 4 km/s. There is some evidence of variation in radial velocity as well as rotational modulation of active latitudes. Even though the outer convective zone of the star only occupies a few percent of the stellar radius, a surface magnetic field has been detected with a strength of 1.4±0.4 Gauss. This surface field forms a relatively simple dipole topology. The star is radiating 3.5 times the luminosity of the Sun from its photosphere at an effective temperature of 6,594 K. It appears to be a source for X-ray emission.

Infrared surveys with the Spitzer and Herschel space telescopes failed to detect an infrared excess around this star at wavelengths up to 160 μm. However, the HOSTS Survey with the Large Binocular Telescope reported a detection of an excess in the far infrared, indicating the presence of exozodiacal dust near the habitable zone of the star.
