= Theta Boötis =

Star in the northern constellation of Boötes

- Location of θ Boötis (circled)

Observation data Epoch J2000 Equinox ICRS
- Constellation: Boötes
- Right ascension: 14^{h} 25^{m} 11.797^{s}
- Declination: +51° 51′ 02.68″
- Apparent magnitude (V): 4.05 + 13.23

Characteristics
- Spectral type: F7 V + M2.5V
- U−B color index: −0.02
- B−V color index: +0.50

Astrometry
Radial velocity (R_{v})	−10.627±0.0065 km/s
Proper motion (μ)	RA: −235.97 mas/yr Dec.: −399.696 mas/yr
Parallax (π)	69.0686±0.1579 mas
Distance	47.2 ± 0.1 ly (14.48 ± 0.03 pc)
Absolute magnitude (M_{V})	3.25

Details

A
Mass	1.232±0.012 M_{☉}
Radius	1.726±0.012 R_{☉}
Luminosity	4.205±0.020 L_{☉}
Surface gravity (log g)	4.06±0.02 cgs
Temperature	6,292±20 K
Metallicity [Fe/H]	0.03 dex
Rotational velocity (v sin i)	29.2 km/s
Age	3.1 Gyr; 3.83 Gyr

B
Mass	0.4–0.48 M_{☉}
Radius	0.4013±0.012 R_{☉}
Luminosity	0.022 L_{☉}
Surface gravity (log g)	4.91 cgs
Temperature	3,521 K
Metallicity [Fe/H]	−0.07 dex

Other designations
- Asellus Primus, θ Boo, 23 Boötis, NSV 6669, BD+52°1804, FK5 531, GC 19467, GJ 549, HD 126660, HIP 70497, HR 5404, SAO 29137, PPM 34508, WDS J14252+5151A, LTT 14245

Database references
SIMBAD	data
ARICNS	data

Theta Boötis is a star in the northern constellation of Boötes the herdsman, forming a corner of the upraised left hand of this asterism. Its name is a Bayer designation that is Latinized from θ Boötis, and abbreviated Theta Boo or θ Boo. This star has the traditional name Asellus Primus, pronounced /əˈsɛləs ˈpraɪməs/, which is Latin for "first donkey colt". Faintly visible to the naked eye, this star has a yellow-white hue with an apparent visual magnitude of 4.05. It is located at a distance of 47.2 light-years (14.5 pc) from the Sun based on parallax measurements, but is drifting closer with a radial velocity of −10.6 km/s. It has a relatively high proper motion, traversing the celestial sphere at the rate of 0.464 arc seconds per annum.

== Properties ==
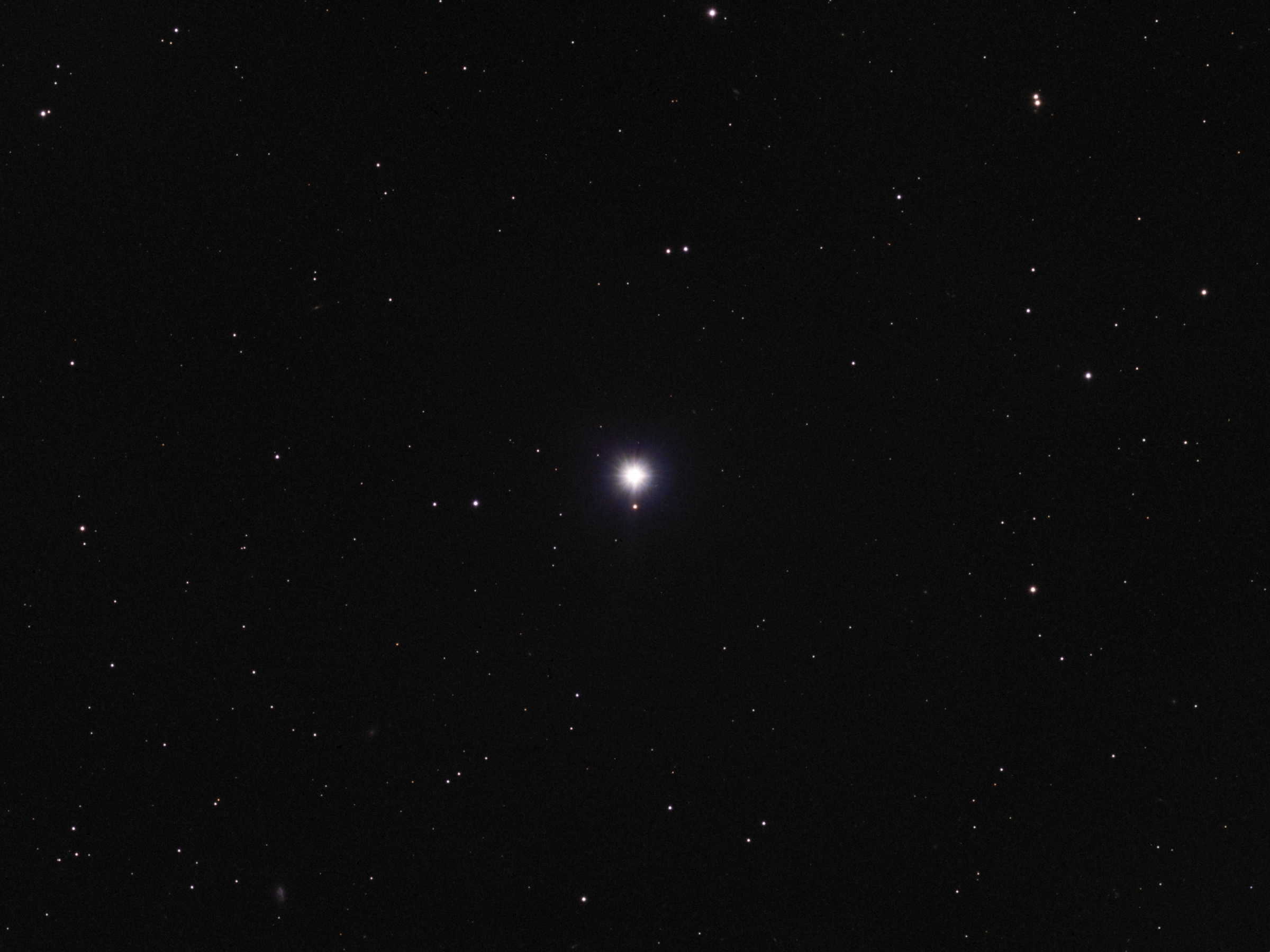
θ Boötis in optical light

The stellar classification of Theta Boötis is F7 V, matching an F-type main-sequence star. It is a solar-type star that may be near the end of its main sequence lifetime based on a high luminosity for a star of its type. Theta Boötis is a suspected variable star and a source of X-ray emission. There is evidence for low amplitude radial velocity variation of about 5 km/s. The star has a magnetic field with a mean longitudinal strength of 147±59 Gauss.

Theta Boötis has a 23% greater mass and a 73% larger radius than the Sun. It is about 3–4 billion years old and is spinning with a projected rotational velocity of 29 km/s. The star is radiating 4.2 times the luminosity of the Sun from its photosphere at an effective temperature of 6,290 K. Based on the proportion of iron found in the stellar spectrum, this star has a near-solar abundance of elements with mass greater than helium.

There is a nearby 11th magnitude optical companion star about 70 arcseconds away. This is a class M2.5 red dwarf that is separated by a minimum of 1,000 AU. It is uncertain whether they are gravitationally bound, but they do have a common motion through space and so the two stars probably share a common origin.

== Nomenclature ==
θ Boötis, along with the other Aselli (ι Boo and κ Boo) and λ Boo, were Aulād al Dhiʼbah (أولاد الضّباع - awlād al-ḍibā), "the Whelps of the Hyenas".

In Chinese, 天枪 (Tiān Qiāng), meaning Celestial Spear, refers to an asterism consisting of θ Boötis, κ^{2} Boötis and ι Boötis. Consequently, the Chinese name for θ Boötis itself is 天枪三 (Tiān Qiāng sān, English: the Third Star of Celestial Spear.)
