= 7 Boötis =

Star in the constellation Boötes

Observation data Epoch J2000 Equinox J2000
- Constellation: Boötes
- Right ascension: 13^{h} 53^{m} 12.93033^{s}
- Declination: +17° 55′ 58.3282″
- Apparent magnitude (V): 5.71

Characteristics
- Evolutionary stage: subgiant
- Spectral type: G5 III
- B−V color index: 0.845

Astrometry
Radial velocity (R_{v})	−11.00±0.18 km/s
Proper motion (μ)	RA: −34.842 mas/yr Dec.: +5.092 mas/yr
Parallax (π)	5.5236±0.0776 mas
Distance	590 ± 8 ly (181 ± 3 pc)

Details
Mass	4.0±0.7 M_{☉}
Radius	19.0 R_{☉}
Luminosity	229 L_{☉}
Temperature	4,600 K
Metallicity [Fe/H]	+0.08 dex
Rotational velocity (v sin i)	14.5 km/s

Other designations
- 7 Boo, BD+18°2795, HD 121107, HIP 67787, HR 5225, SAO 100751

Database references
SIMBAD	data

7 Boötis is a single star in the northern constellation of Boötes, located 590 light-years away from the Sun. It is barely visible to the naked eye as a dim, yellow-hued star with an apparent visual magnitude of 5.71. 7 Boötis is moving closer to the Earth with a heliocentric radial velocity of −11 km/s.

This is an evolved subgiant star with a stellar classification of G5 III, currently at the end of the Hertzsprung gap. It has a weak level of magnetic activity but a fairly strong X-ray luminosity of 3.72×10^{20} erg s^{−1}. The rotation rate is moderate, with a projected rotational velocity of 14.5 km/s. It has four times the mass of the Sun and has expanded to 19 times the Sun's radius. The star is radiating 229 times the Sun's luminosity from its enlarged photosphere at an effective temperature of 4,600 K.
