= HD 118889 =

Binary star system in the constellation Boötes

Observation data Epoch J2000 Equinox ICRS
- Constellation: Boötes
- Right ascension: 13^{h} 39^{m} 34.61613^{s}
- Declination: +10° 44′ 46.5827″
- Apparent magnitude (V): 5.57 (6.35 + 6.47)‍

Characteristics
- Evolutionary stage: Main sequence
- Spectral type: F0V
- U−B color index: +0.045
- B−V color index: +0.33

Astrometry
Radial velocity (R_{v})	−25.9±1.9 km/s
Proper motion (μ)	RA: −114.96 mas/yr Dec.: −11.74 mas/yr
Parallax (π)	16.67±0.58 mas
Distance	196 ± 7 ly (60 ± 2 pc)
Absolute magnitude (M_{V})	+2.40

Orbit
Period (P)	22.460±0.019 yr
Semi-major axis (a)	0.19983±0.00055″
Eccentricity (e)	0.5450±0.0022
Inclination (i)	43.50±0.40°
Longitude of the node (Ω)	34.58±0.52°
Periastron epoch (T)	B 1929.850±0.024
Argument of periastron (ω) (secondary)	359.93±0.79°

Details

A
Mass	1.59 M_{☉}

B
Mass	1.55 M_{☉}

Other designations
- BD+11°2589, HD 118889, HIP 66640, HR 5138, SAO 100654, ADS 8987, WDS 13396+1045, BU 612

Database references
SIMBAD	data

HD 118889 is a binary star system in the northern constellation of Boötes. It is faintly visible to the naked eye as a point of light with an apparent visual magnitude of 5.57. The system is located at a distance of approximately 196 light years from the Sun based on stellar parallax, but is drifting closer with a radial velocity of −26 km/s.

The binary components of this system were first measured by S. W. Burnham in 1878 and it was given the discovery code BU 612. The pair are orbiting each other with a period of 22.46 years with an eccentricity (ovalness) of 0.545. The primary component is magnitude 6.35, with the secondary slightly fainter at magnitude 6.47.

A third star, 3.5″ away, is a 12th-magnitude common-proper-motion companion. Any orbit would take over a thousand years.
