= Iota Boötis =

Binary star system in the constellation of Boötes

ι Boötis
- Location of ι Boötis (circled)

Observation data Epoch J2000 Equinox ICRS
- Constellation: Boötes
- Right ascension: 14^{h} 16^{m} 09.930^{s}
- Declination: +51° 22′ 02.029″
- Apparent magnitude (V): 4.75 (4.73–4.78)

Characteristics
- Spectral type: A7 V + K0 V
- U−B color index: +0.06
- B−V color index: +0.20
- R−I color index: +0.09
- Variable type: Delta Scuti variable

Astrometry
Radial velocity (R_{v})	−18.7 km/s
Proper motion (μ)	RA: −149.277 mas/yr Dec.: +89.135 mas/yr
Parallax (π)	33.8856±0.0820 mas
Distance	96.3 ± 0.2 ly (29.51 ± 0.07 pc)
Absolute magnitude (M_{V})	+2.38

Details

ι Boo A
Mass	1.650±0.04 M_{☉}
Radius	1.715^{+0.055}_{−0.021} R_{☉}
Luminosity	8.90^{+0.06}_{−0.07} L_{☉}
Surface gravity (log g)	4.14^{+0.01}_{−0.02} cgs
Temperature	7,764^{+3}_{−8} K
Metallicity [Fe/H]	+0.19 dex
Rotational velocity (v sin i)	144 km/s
Age	785±223 Myr

HD 234121
Mass	0.807^{+0.042}_{−0.041} M_{☉}
Radius	0.824±0.017 R_{☉}
Luminosity	0.411^{+0.051}_{−0.041} L_{☉}
Surface gravity (log g)	4.511^{+0.018}_{−0.005} cgs
Temperature	5,090^{+17}_{−4} K

Other designations
- Asellus Secondus, ι Boötis, 21 Boötis, BD+52°1784, FK5 528, GC 19269, HD 125161, HIP 69713, HR 5350, SAO 29071, PPM 34432, WDS J14162+5122

Database references
SIMBAD	data

Data sources:

Hipparcos Catalogue, CCDM (2002), Bright Star Catalogue (5th rev. ed.)

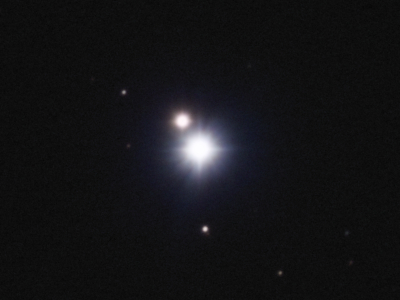
ι Boötis and its nearby companion HD 234121 (the faint component C is also visible to the south)

Iota Boötis is a wide binary star system in the constellation Boötes, approximately 96 light-years from Earth. Its name is a Bayer designation that is Latinized from ι Boötis, and abbreviated Iota Boo or ι Boo. The brighter component has the traditional name Asellus Secundus, pronounced /əˈsɛləs sɪˈkʌndəs/, which is Latin for "second donkey colt", and the Flamsteed designation 21 Boötis. It is faintly visible to the naked eye with a typical apparent visual magnitude of +4.75. Based on parallax measurements, it is located at a distance of 96 light-years (29 pc) from the Earth. The star is drifting closer to the Sun with a radial velocity of −19 km/s.

The companion is HD 234121, a K-type main-sequence star at an angular distance of 38.6 arcseconds; easily separated with binoculars.

== Components ==
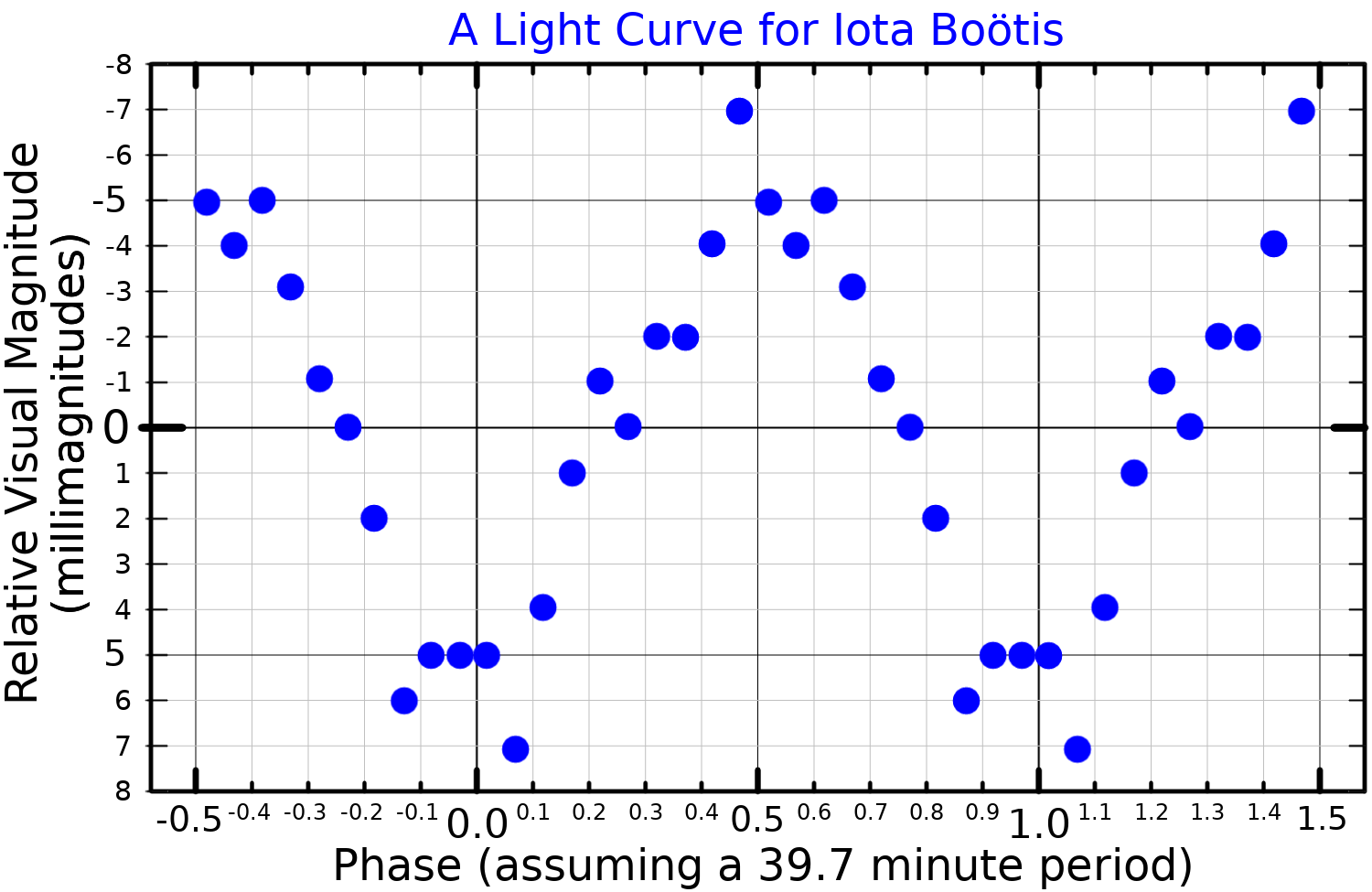
A visual band light curve for Iota Boötis, adapted from Kiss (1995)

The primary component is a white hued A-type main-sequence star with a stellar classification of A7V. It is classified as a Delta Scuti-type variable star and its brightness varies from magnitude +4.73 to +4.78 with a stable period of 38 minutes. This star is 785 million years old and has a high rate of spin, showing a projected rotational velocity of 144 km/s. It has 1.8 times the mass of the Sun and 1.7 times the Sun's radius. Iota Boötis is radiating 8.8 times the luminosity of the Sun from its photosphere at an effective temperature of 7,764 K.

The common proper motion companion, HD 234121, is a magnitude 7.3 main-sequence star belonging to spectral class K0V. It has a projected separation from ι Boo of 1,100 AU. HD 234121 has a mass of 0.8 M_{☉}, a luminosity of 0.4 L_{☉}, a temperature of 5,090 K, and a radius of 0.8 R_{☉}.

The Washington Double Star Catalog lists a third component, a 14th-magnitude star at 90 arcseconds, but it is an unrelated background star.

== Nomenclature ==
This star, along with the other Aselli (θ Boo and κ Boo) and λ Boo, were Aulād al Dhiʼbah (أولاد الضّباع - awlād al-ḍibā‘), literally "the Whelps of the Hyenas".

In Chinese, 天槍 (Tiān Qiāng), meaning Celestial Spear, refers to an asterism consisting of ι Boötis, κ^{2} Boötis and θ Boötis. Consequently, the Chinese name for ι Boötis itself is 天槍二 (Tiān Qiāng èr, English: the Second Star of Celestial Spear).
