= 33 Boötis =

Star in the constellation Boötes

- Location of 33 Boötis (circled in red)

Observation data Epoch J2000 Equinox ICRS
- Constellation: Boötes
- Right ascension: 14^{h} 38^{m} 50.225^{s}
- Declination: +44° 24′ 16.21″
- Apparent magnitude (V): 5.39

Characteristics

primary
- Evolutionary stage: main sequence
- Spectral type: A1 V
- B−V color index: 0.030±0.003

companion
- Evolutionary stage: brown dwarf
- Spectral type: M5-M8

Astrometry
Radial velocity (R_{v})	−23.8±2.6 km/s
Proper motion (μ)	RA: −67.847 mas/yr Dec.: −18.424 mas/yr
Parallax (π)	17.1844±0.1516 mas
Distance	190 ± 2 ly (58.2 ± 0.5 pc)
Absolute magnitude (M_{V})	1.61

Orbit
Period (P)	25.6+4.4 −3.1 yr
Semi-major axis (a)	11.1+1.3 −1.0 AU
Eccentricity (e)	0.87+0.10 −0.22
Inclination (i)	98+20 −10°
Longitude of the node (Ω)	122.5+176 −6.2°
Periastron epoch (T)	2463402+1111 −7509 JD
Argument of periastron (ω) (secondary)	176+164 −156°

Details

A
Mass	2.07±0.24 M_{☉}
Radius	1.84 R_{☉}
Luminosity	21.2 L_{☉}
Surface gravity (log g)	4.18 cgs
Temperature	9,224 K
Rotational velocity (v sin i)	86 km/s
Age	142 Myr

B
Mass	60+27 −21 M_{Jup}
Radius	1.696 R_{Jup}
Luminosity	(1.05–0.52)×10^{−3} L_{☉}
Temperature	2,700±100 K

Other designations
- 33 Boo, BD+45°2204, FK5 540, HD 129002, HIP 71618, HR 5468, SAO 45153

Database references
SIMBAD	data

33 Boötis is a star with a brown dwarf companion in the northern constellation Boötes, located 190 light years away from the Sun. It is visible to the naked eye as a faint, white-hued star with an apparent visual magnitude of 5.39. The object is moving closer to the Earth with a heliocentric radial velocity of −13 km/s, and is catalogued as a member of the Pleiades supercluster.

This is an ordinary A-type main-sequence star with a stellar classification of A1 V. It is a source of X-ray emission, but early A-type stars are not expected to be X-ray sources, so this may indicate it has an undetected companion. 33 Boötis is 142 million years old with a projected rotational velocity of 86 km/s. The star has 2.07 times the mass of the Sun, 1.84 times the Sun's radius and is radiating 21.2 times the luminosity of the Sun from its photosphere at an effective temperature of 9,224 K.

33 Boötis is orbited by a brown dwarf with roughly 60 times the mass of Jupiter and 1.7 times the radius. It takes roughly 26 years to complete one highly-eccentric orbit, coming as close as 1.4 AU at periastron and as distant as 21 AU at apoastron. (Note: Calculated using the equations a(1 + e) and a(1 − e) for apoastron and periastron, respectively, where a is the semi-major axis and e is the eccentricity.) The companion was detected in 2025 from observations with the Subaru and Keck telescopes, as well as Hipparcos and Gaia astrometry.
