= 22 Boötis =

Star in the constellation Boötes

Observation data Epoch J2000 Equinox J2000
- Constellation: Boötes
- Right ascension: 14^{h} 26^{m} 27.36529^{s}
- Declination: +19° 13′ 36.8470″
- Apparent magnitude (V): 5.40

Characteristics
- Spectral type: kA7hA8mF2(III)((Sr II))
- B−V color index: 0.231±0.006

Astrometry
Radial velocity (R_{v})	−27.4±0.5 km/s
Proper motion (μ)	RA: −70.131 mas/yr Dec.: +26.084 mas/yr
Parallax (π)	10.2279±0.1491 mas
Distance	319 ± 5 ly (98 ± 1 pc)
Absolute magnitude (M_{V})	0.65

Details
Mass	1.99±0.02 M_{☉}
Radius	4.03+0.23 −0.26 R_{☉}
Luminosity	52.43±0.89 L_{☉}
Surface gravity (log g)	3.13±0.52 cgs
Temperature	7,528+277 −207 K
Metallicity [Fe/H]	+0.36±0.04 dex
Rotational velocity (v sin i)	37.74±2.12 km/s

Other designations
- f Boo, 22 Boo, BD+19°2810, FK5 1378, GC 19480, HD 126661, HIP 70602, HR 5405, SAO 101025

Database references
SIMBAD	data

22 Boötis is a single star in the northern constellation of Boötes, located 319 light years away from the Sun. It has the Bayer designation f Boötis; 22 Boötis is the Flamsteed designation. This object is visible to the naked eye as a dim, white-hued star with an apparent visual magnitude of 5.40. It is moving closer to the Earth with a heliocentric radial velocity of −27 km/s.

This is an Am star with a stellar classification of kA7 hA8 mF2 (III) ((Sr II)), showing the calcium K line of an A7 star, the hydrogen lines of an A8 star, and the metal lines of an F2 star. It has the luminosity class of a giant star and does not appear to be variable. The star has twice the mass of the Sun and four times the Sun's radius. It is spinning with a projected rotational velocity of 38 km/s. 22 Boötis is radiating 52 times the Sun's luminosity from its photosphere at an effective temperature of 7,528 K.
