= 3 Boötis =

Star in the constellation Boötes

Observation data Epoch J2000 Equinox J2000
- Constellation: Boötes
- Right ascension: 13^{h} 46^{m} 43.32359^{s}
- Declination: +25° 42′ 08.0548″
- Apparent magnitude (V): 5.97

Characteristics
- Evolutionary stage: subgiant + main sequence
- Spectral type: kA9hF6mF6 (A7 V: + G5 III: or F2p + G0 IV)
- B−V color index: 0.523±0.004

Astrometry
Radial velocity (R_{v})	11.9±0.9 km/s
Proper motion (μ)	RA: −18.564 mas/yr Dec.: −59.093 mas/yr
Parallax (π)	10.5064±0.0425 mas
Distance	310 ± 1 ly (95.2 ± 0.4 pc)
Absolute magnitude (M_{V})	1.21

Orbit
Period (P)	36.006 d
Eccentricity (e)	0.543±0.002
Inclination (i)	74.5±2.0°
Semi-amplitude (K_{1}) (primary)	52.30±0.19 km/s
Semi-amplitude (K_{2}) (secondary)	59.0±0.6 km/s

Details

3 Boo A
Mass	1.8 M_{☉}
Radius	3.7 R_{☉}
Temperature	5,848 K

3 Boo A
Mass	1.6 M_{☉}
Radius	2.6 R_{☉}
Temperature	6,745 K
Age	1.5 Gyr

Other designations
- 3 Boo, BD+26°2494, FK5 1358, HD 120064, HIP 67239, HR 5182, SAO 82993

Database references
SIMBAD	data

3 Boötis is a close binary star system in the northern constellation of Boötes, located 310 light years away from the Sun based upon parallax. It can be viewed with the naked eye in excellent seeing conditions as a dim star with an apparent visual magnitude of 5.97. The system is moving further from the Earth with a heliocentric radial velocity of 12 km/s.

This is a double-lined spectroscopic binary system with an orbital period of 36 days and an eccentricity of 0.543. The orbital plane is inclined 74.5° and the system does not form an eclipsing binary. The primary component is an evolving star currently in the Hertzsprung gap. Its companion is a main sequence star. Both members have more mass than the Sun and they are around 1.5 billion years old.
