= HR 5553 =

Binary star system in the constellation Boötes

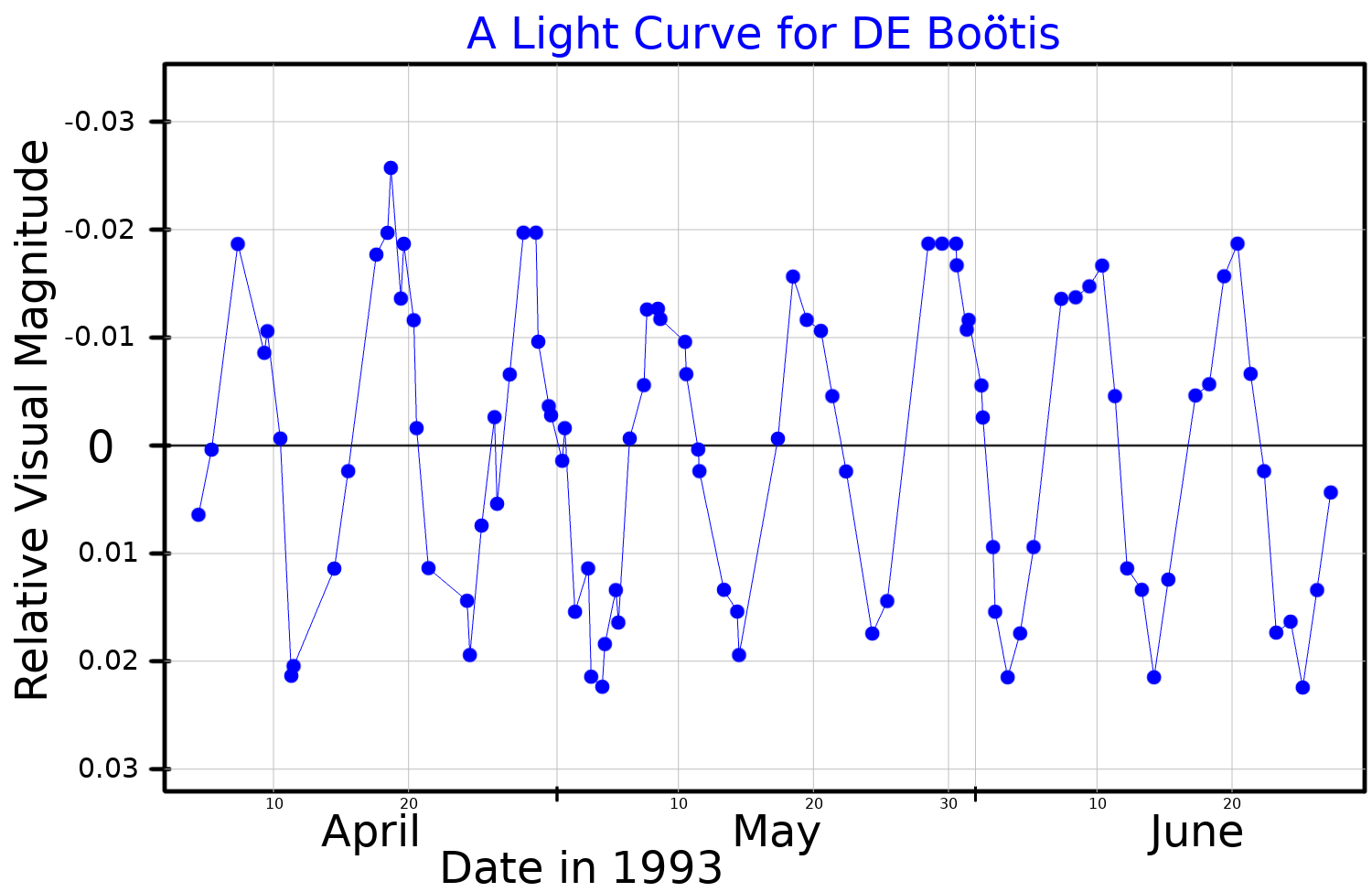
- A visual band light curve for DE Boötes, adapted from Henry et al. (1995)

Observation data Epoch J2000 Equinox ICRS
- Constellation: Boötes
- Right ascension: 14^{h} 53^{m} 23.76674^{s}
- Declination: +19° 09′ 10.0813″
- Apparent magnitude (V): 6.00 (5.97 to 6.04)

Characteristics
- Evolutionary stage: main sequence
- Spectral type: K0 V
- U−B color index: +0.49
- B−V color index: +0.84
- Variable type: RS CVn

Astrometry
Radial velocity (R_{v})	−29.82±0.15 km/s
Proper motion (μ)	RA: −442.23 mas/yr Dec.: +217.61 mas/yr
Parallax (π)	86.88±0.46 mas
Distance	37.5 ± 0.2 ly (11.51 ± 0.06 pc)
Absolute magnitude (M_{V})	5.69

Orbit
Period (P)	125.396±0.001 d
Semi-major axis (a)	0.19±0.03 AU
Eccentricity (e)	0.51±0.001
Inclination (i)	93.4±4.2°
Longitude of the node (Ω)	248.3±3.6°
Argument of periastron (ω) (secondary)	219±0.1°

Details

HR 5553 A
Mass	0.84 M_{☉}
Radius	0.87 R_{☉}
Luminosity	0.498 L_{☉}
Surface gravity (log g)	4.57 cgs
Temperature	5,313 K
Metallicity [Fe/H]	0.10 dex
Rotation	10.4
Rotational velocity (v sin i)	4.0 km/s
Age	0.7–1.3 Gyr

HR 5553 B
Mass	0.45 M_{☉}
Radius	0.37 R_{☉}
Luminosity	0.021 L_{☉}
Temperature	3,596 K

Other designations
- DE Boo, BD+19°2881, GJ 567, HD 131511, HIP 72848, LHS 5279

Database references
SIMBAD	data

HR 5553 is a binary star system located thirty-eight light-years away from the Sun, in the northern constellation Boötes. It has the variable star designation DE Boötis, and is classified as an RS Canum Venaticorum variable that ranges in apparent visual magnitude from 5.97 down to 6.04, which is bright enough to be dimly visible to the naked eye. The system is drifting closer to the Sun with a radial velocity of −30 km/s, and is expected to come as close as 26.9 light-years in 210,000 years.

Orbital elements for this single-lined spectroscopic binary was first calculated in 1981 using radial velocity measurements from David Dunlap Observatory combined with older measurements from Mount Wilson Observatory and Dominion Astrophysical Observatory. The two stars orbit each other with a period of 125 days and a large eccentricity of 0.51.

Marcel Golay listed the star as a suspected variable star in 1973. Gregory W. Henry et al. confirmed that it is a variable star in 1995. It was given its variable star designation, DE Boötis, in 1997.

The primary, designated component A, is a K-type main sequence star with a stellar classification of K0 V. It is around one billion years old and is spinning with a projected rotational velocity of 4 km/s. The star has 84% of the mass of the Sun and 86% of the Sun's radius. It is radiating 50% of the luminosity of the Sun from its photosphere at an effective temperature of 5,313 K. Component B has an estimated 45% of the mass of the Sun.

An infrared excess has been detected around this system, most likely indicating the presence of a circumstellar disk at a radius of 34.2 AU. The temperature of this dust is 40 K. The estimated mass of the dust is 0.0002 times the mass of the Earth. It is aligned to within 10° of the plane of the binary system.
