= Rho Boötis =

Star in the constellation Boötes

ρ Boötis
- Location of ρ Boötes (circled)

Observation data Epoch J2000 Equinox ICRS
- Constellation: Boötes
- Right ascension: 14^{h} 31^{m} 49.789^{s}
- Declination: +30° 22′ 17.17″
- Apparent magnitude (V): 3.59

Characteristics
- Spectral type: K4 III
- U−B color index: +1.44
- B−V color index: +1.30
- R−I color index: 0.65
- Variable type: RS CVn.

Astrometry
Radial velocity (R_{v})	−13.57±0.19 km/s
Proper motion (μ)	RA: –100.531 mas/yr Dec.: +119.870 mas/yr
Parallax (π)	19.8550±0.1587 mas
Distance	164 ± 1 ly (50.4 ± 0.4 pc)
Absolute magnitude (M_{V})	+0.27

Details
Mass	1.29±0.12 M_{☉}
Radius	20.58±0.19 R_{☉}
Luminosity	128.9±6.8 L_{☉}
Surface gravity (log g)	1.85±0.05 cgs
Temperature	4,285±54 K
Metallicity [Fe/H]	−0.19±0.10 dex
Rotational velocity (v sin i)	5.0 km/s
Age	4.31±1.17 Gyr

Other designations
- Kalasungsang, ρ Boo, 25 Boötis, BD+31°2628, FK5 534, GC 19597, HD 127665, HIP 71053, HR 5429, SAO 64202, PPM 77975, WDS J14318+3022A

Database references
SIMBAD	data

Rho Boötis, Latinised from ρ Boötis and formally named Kalasungsang, is a single, orange-hued star in the northern constellation of Boötes. This star is visible to the naked eye with an apparent visual magnitude of 3.59. Based upon parallax measurements, it is located at a distance of approximately 164 light-years (50 parsecs) from Earth. It is moving closer to the Sun with a radial velocity of −13.6 km/s. There is an optical companion, a magnitude 11.5 star, located 34.7 arcseconds away along a position angle of 345° (as of 2013).

== Nomenclature ==
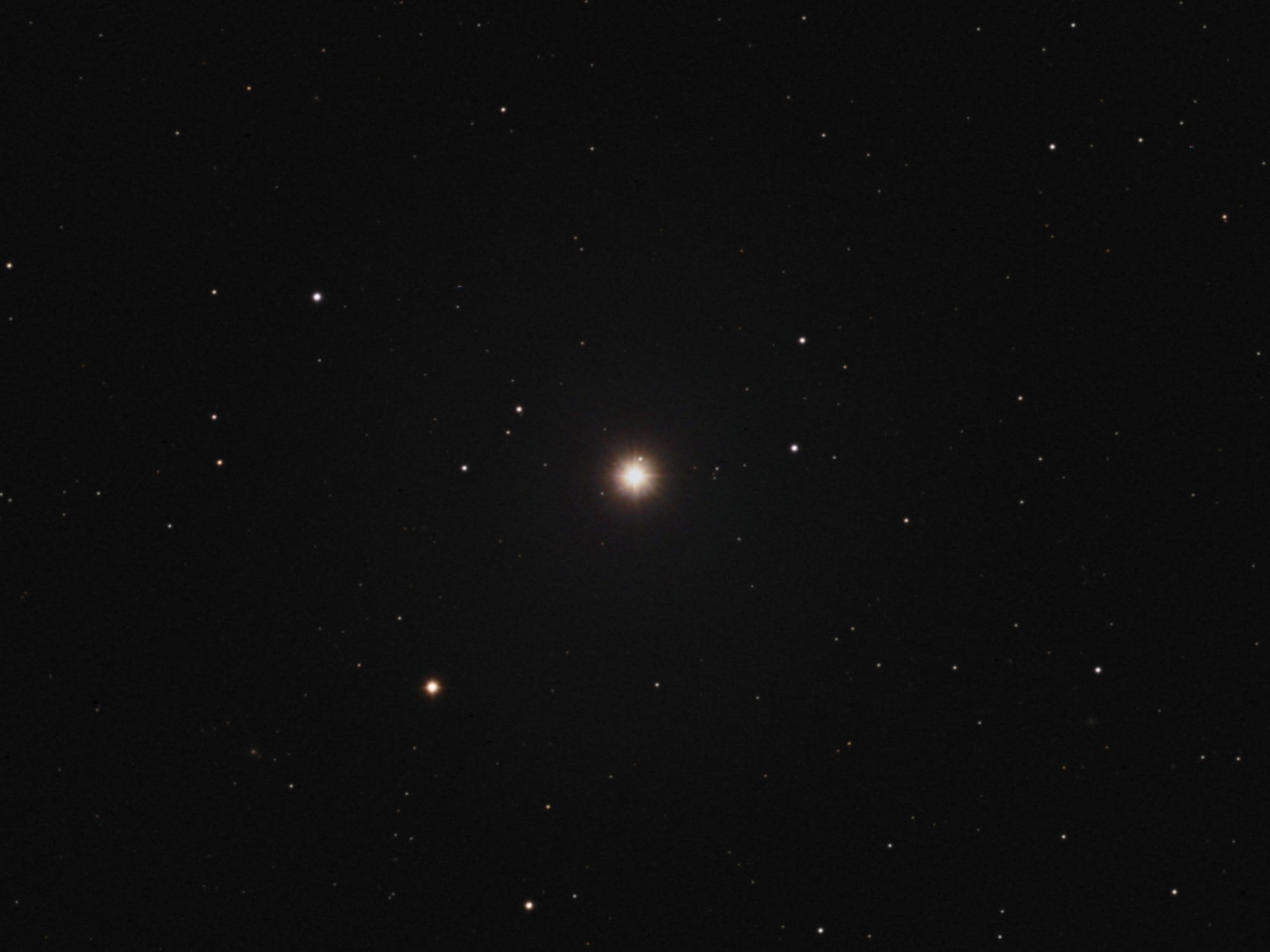
ρ Boötis in optical light

Rho Boötis is a Bayer designation that is Latinised from ρ Boötis, and abbreviated Rho Boo or ρ Boo. It is known by several other catalog designations, including 25 Boötis, BD+31°2628, FK5 534, HD 127665, HIP 71053, HR 5429, and SAO 64202. In Chinese astronomy, 梗河 (Gěng Hé), meaning Celestial Lance, refers to an asterism consisting of ρ Boötis, ε Boötis and σ Boötis. Consequently, the Chinese name for ρ Boötis itself is 梗河三 (Gěng Hé sān, English: the Third Star of Celestial Lance).

The IAU Working Group on Star Names approved the name Kalasungsang for ρ Boötis on 15 April 2026. Kala Sungsang, the upside-down demon, is a constellation from Bali (Indonesia), corresponding to Boötes. The term is derived from Sanskrit काल kālá meaning death or time.

== Properties ==
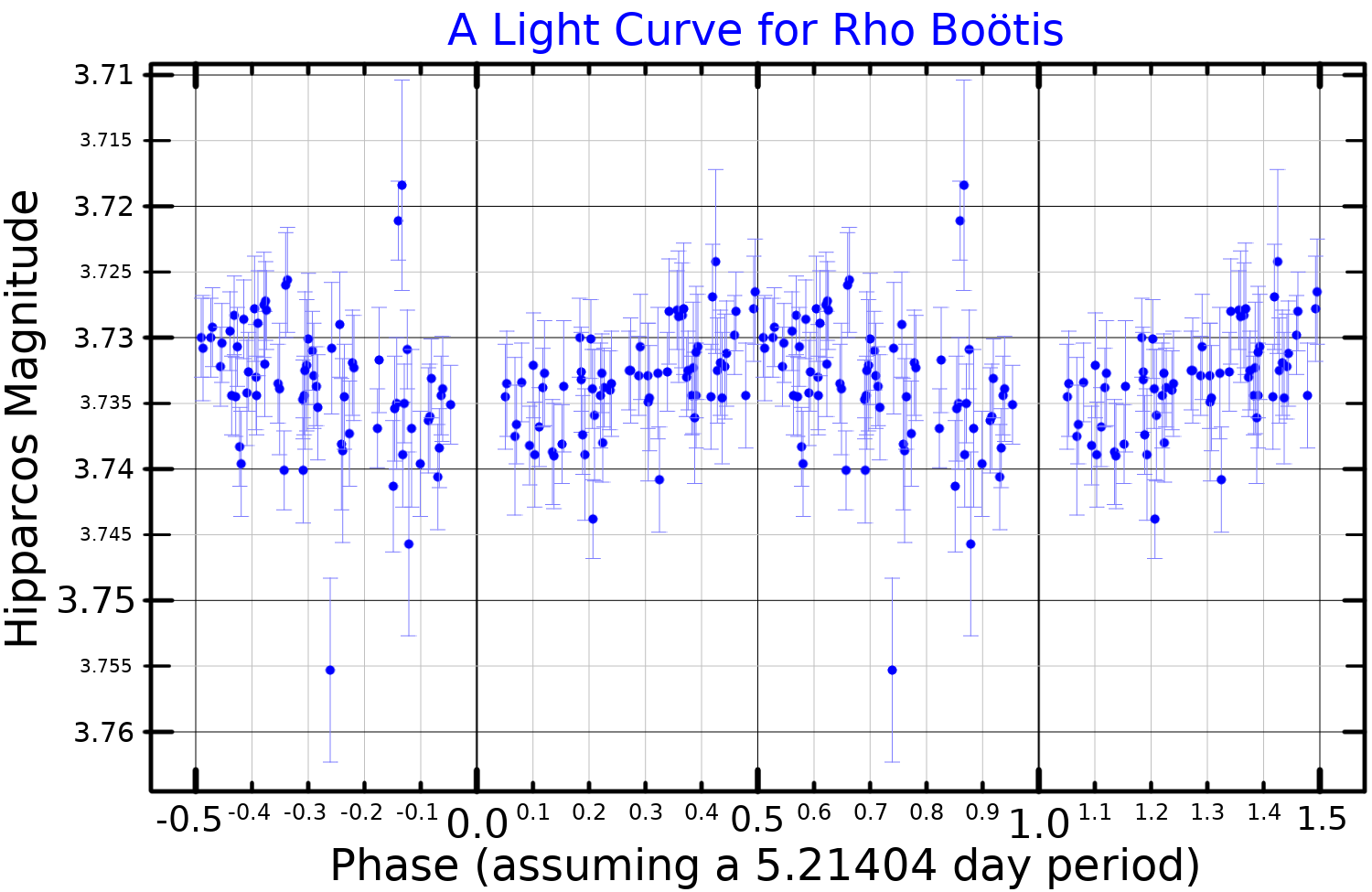
A light curve for Rho Boötis, plotted from Hipparcos data

This is an evolved K-type giant star, currently on the red-giant branch, with a stellar classification of K4 III and an estimated age of 4 billion years. Since 1943, the spectrum of this star has served as one of the stable anchor points by which other stars are classified. With around 1.23 times the mass of the Sun, it has expanded to 20.6 times the Sun's girth. The star is radiating 129 times the Sun's luminosity from its enlarged photosphere at an effective temperature of about 4,285 K. Rho Boötis is classified as a RS Canum Venaticorum variable. Koen and Eyer examined the Hipparcos data for this star, and found that it varied with a period of 5.214 days, and an amplitude of 0.0027 magnitudes.
