= Kappa Boötis =

Double star in the constellation Boötes

κ Boötis
- Location of κ Boötis (circled)

Observation data Epoch J2000 Equinox ICRS
- Constellation: Boötes
- κ^{1} Boötis
- Right ascension: 14^{h} 13^{m} 27.824^{s}
- Declination: +51° 47′ 16.62″
- Apparent magnitude (V): +6.69
- κ^{2} Boötis
- Right ascension: 14^{h} 13^{m} 29.008^{s}
- Declination: +51° 47′ 23.88″
- Apparent magnitude (V): +4.50 to +4.58

Characteristics

κ^{1} Boötis
- Evolutionary stage: main sequence
- Spectral type: F2V
- B−V color index: 0.394±0.005

κ^{2} Boötis
- Evolutionary stage: main sequence
- Spectral type: A8IV
- U−B color index: 0.14
- B−V color index: 0.2
- R−I color index: 0.12
- Variable type: Delta Scuti variable

Astrometry

κ^{1} Boötis
Radial velocity (R_{v})	−22.09 km/s
Proper motion (μ)	RA: 44.094 mas/yr Dec.: −39.325 mas/yr
Parallax (π)	20.3067±0.2221 mas
Distance	161 ± 2 ly (49.2 ± 0.5 pc)
Absolute magnitude (M_{V})	+3.29

κ^{2} Boötis
Radial velocity (R_{v})	−15.60 km/s
Proper motion (μ)	RA: 61.899 mas/yr Dec.: −9.615 mas/yr
Parallax (π)	20.1530±0.0943 mas
Distance	161.8 ± 0.8 ly (49.6 ± 0.2 pc)

Orbit
Primary	κ^{1} Boötis Aa
Name	κ^{1} Boötis Ab
Period (P)	4.904 yr
Semi-major axis (a)	3.56 au
Eccentricity (e)	0.53
Inclination (i)	109±14°
Longitude of the node (Ω)	251±10°
Periastron epoch (T)	2010.917
Argument of periastron (ω) (secondary)	82±15°

Orbit
Primary	κ^{1} Boötis
Name	κ^{2} Boötis
Period (P)	6,306+1,362 −800 yr
Semi-major axis (a)	11.10+1.56 −0.96″
Eccentricity (e)	0.44+0.10 −0.19
Inclination (i)	99.2+1.1 −1.4°
Longitude of the node (Ω)	234.1+0.2 −1.7°
Periastron epoch (T)	6515+119 −611
Argument of periastron (ω) (secondary)	208.0+16.5 −16.6°

Details

κ^{1} Boötis A
Mass	1.40±0.02 M_{☉}
Radius	1.43^{+0.05}_{−0.10} R_{☉}
Luminosity	3.801^{+0.083}_{−0.082} L_{☉}
Surface gravity (log g)	4.32 cgs
Temperature	6,744^{+254}_{−108} K
Metallicity [Fe/H]	−0.09 dex
Rotational velocity (v sin i)	38 km/s
Age	900 Myr

κ^{1} Boötis B
Mass	≥0.48 M_{☉}

κ^{2} Boötis
Mass	2.12 M_{☉}
Radius	2.78 R_{☉}
Luminosity	28 L_{☉}
Surface gravity (log g)	3.66 cgs
Temperature	7,760 K
Metallicity [Fe/H]	−0.29 dex
Rotational velocity (v sin i)	128 km/s

Other designations
- Asellus Tertius, κ Boo, 17 Boötis, BD+52 1782, WDS J14135+5147
- κ^{1} Boötis: GC 19204, HD 124674, HIP 69481, HR 5328, SAO 29045, PPM 34402
- κ^{2} Boötis: GC 19207, HD 124675, HIP 69483, HR 5329, SAO 29046, PPM 34403

Database references
SIMBAD	data
- κ^{1}
- κ^{2}

Kappa Boötis is a multiple star system in the constellation Boötes. Its name is a Bayer designation that is Latinized from κ Boötis, and abbreviated Kappa Boo or κ Boo. This star has the traditional name Asellus Tertius, which is pronounced /əˈsɛləs ˈtɜːrʃiəs/ and is Latin for "third donkey colt". The components have an angular separation of 13.5 arcsec; viewable in a small telescope. Kappa Boötis is approximately 162 light-years (50 pc) from Earth.

== Properties ==
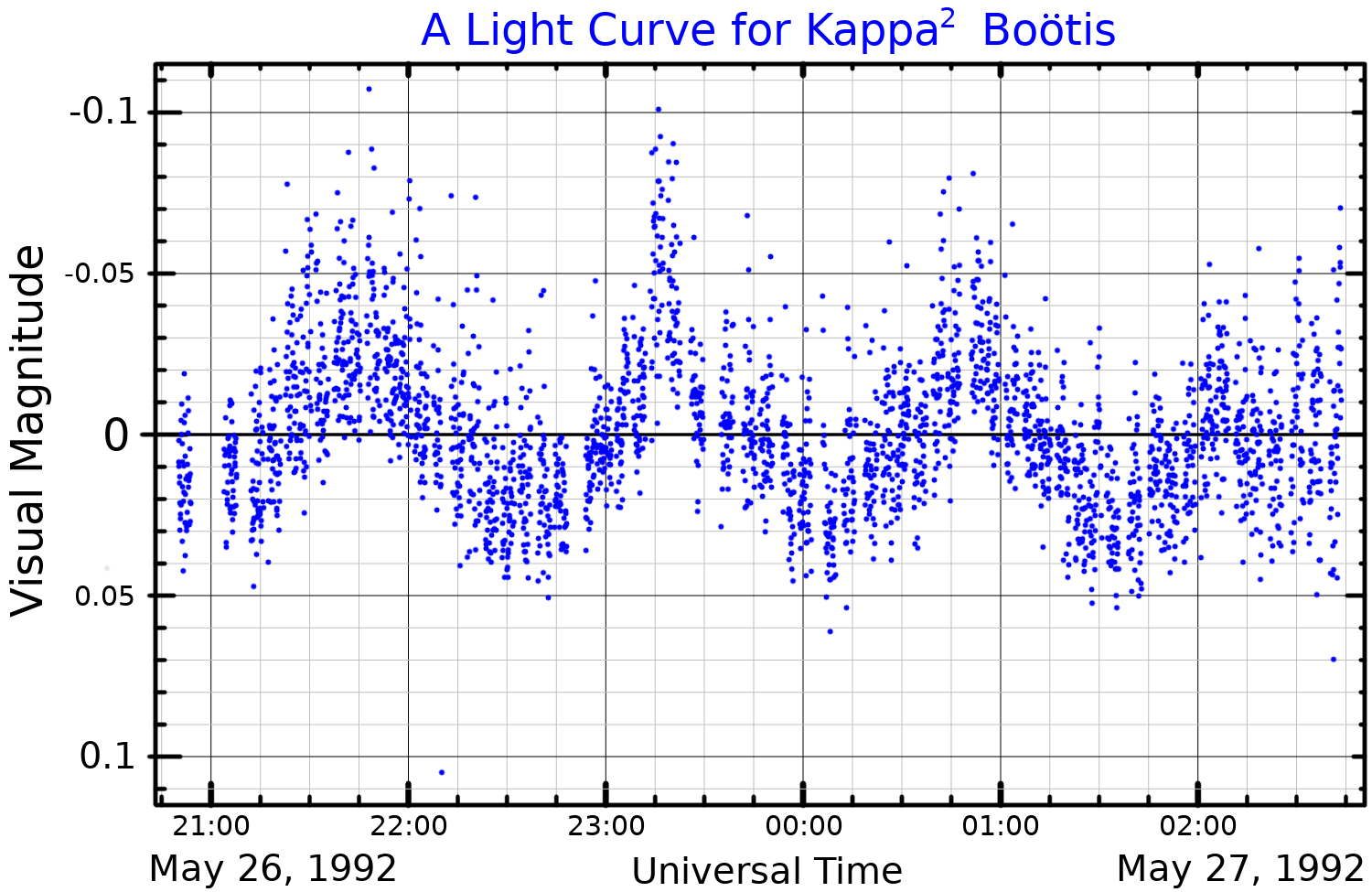
A visual band light curve for Kappa^{2} Boötis, adapted from Frandsen et al. (1995)

κ^{1} Boötis is itself a double-lined spectroscopic binary star system. The primary component is an F-type main-sequence star star of class F2V, while the secondary is at least half the mass and much fainter.

κ^{2} Boötis is classified as a Delta Scuti type variable star with a period of 1.08 hours Its brightness varies from magnitude +4.50 to +4.58. It is a slightly evolved A8 subgiant, which indicates the hydrogen at its core is all but exhausted. This star has more than double the mass of the Sun and nearly three times its girth. It has a high rate of spin, showing a projected rotational velocity of 128 km/s. The star is radiating 28 times the luminosity of the Sun from its photosphere at an effective temperature of 7,760 K.

A 17th-magnitude star nearly two arc-minutes away has been identified as a member of the multiple system with an estimated orbital period of 177,000 years. It is itself a close binary system consisting of two similar low-mass stars in a 234-year orbit.

== Nomenclature ==
κ^{2} Boötis, the brighter star of the pair, is also designated HD 124675, while κ^{1} Boötis is HD 124674. The two stars share the Flamsteed designation 17 Boötis, but they have separate entries in the Hipparcos catalogue: HIP 69483 and HIP 69481 respectively.

This star, along with the other Aselli (θ Boo and ι Boo) and λ Boo, were Aulād al Dhiʼbah (أولاد الضّباع - awlād al-ḍibā), "the Whelps of the Hyenas".

In Chinese, 天槍 (Tiān Qiāng), meaning Celestial Spear, refers to an asterism consisting of κ (actually κ^{2}) Boötis, ι Boötis and θ Boötis. Consequently, the Chinese name for κ Boötis itself is 天槍一 (Tiān Qiāng yī, English: the First Star of Celestial Spear.)
