= Chi Boötis =

Star in the constellation Boötes

χ Boötis
- Location of χ Boötis (circled in red)

Observation data Epoch J2000.0 Equinox J2000.0 (ICRS)
- Constellation: Boötes
- Right ascension: 15^{h} 14^{m} 29.159^{s}
- Declination: +29° 09′ 51.47″
- Apparent magnitude (V): 5.28

Characteristics
- Evolutionary stage: main sequence
- Spectral type: A2 V
- U−B color index: +0.08
- B−V color index: +0.02

Astrometry
Radial velocity (R_{v})	−16.0±0.8 km/s
Proper motion (μ)	RA: −69.512 mas/yr Dec.: +28.662 mas/yr
Parallax (π)	13.3668±0.0584 mas
Distance	244 ± 1 ly (74.8 ± 0.3 pc)
Absolute magnitude (M_{V})	+0.84

Details
Mass	2.09 M_{☉}
Radius	2.24 R_{☉}
Luminosity	36.8 L_{☉}
Surface gravity (log g)	3.96±0.14 cgs
Temperature	9,268±315 K
Rotational velocity (v sin i)	84 km/s
Age	340 Myr

Other designations
- χ Boo, 48 Boötis, BD+29°2640, FK5 3204, GC 20495, HD 135502, HIP 74596, HR 5676, SAO 83729

Database references
SIMBAD	data

Chi Boötis is a single, white-hued star in the northern constellation Boötes, near the eastern constellation border with Corona Borealis. Its name is a Bayer designation that is Latinised from χ Boötis, and abbreviated Cho Boo or χ Boo. This star is faintly visible to the naked eye with an apparent visual magnitude of +5.3. Based upon an annual parallax shift of 13.4 mas as seen from the Earth, it is located approximately 244 light-years (75 pc) from Earth. The star is moving closer to the Sun with a radial velocity of −16 km/s.

This is an A-type main-sequence star with a stellar classification of A2 V, which indicates it is generating energy via hydrogen fusion at its core. It is about 340 million years old with a projected rotational velocity of 84 km/s. The star has double the mass of the Sun, 2.24 times the Sun's radius, and is emitting 37 times the Sun's luminosity from its photosphere at an effective temperature of around 9,268 K. It displays an infrared excess at an emission temperature of 65 K, indicating there is a circumstellar disk of dust orbiting the star at a distance of around 123 AU.
