= 40 Boötis =

Star in the constellation Boötes

Observation data Epoch J2000 Equinox ICRS
- Constellation: Boötes
- Right ascension: 14^{h} 59^{m} 36.94745^{s}
- Declination: +39° 15′ 55.1994″
- Apparent magnitude (V): 5.64

Characteristics
- Evolutionary stage: giant
- Spectral type: F1 III–IV
- B−V color index: 0.336±0.004

Astrometry
Radial velocity (R_{v})	+12.3±0.7 km/s
Proper motion (μ)	RA: −32.109 mas/yr Dec.: 41.246 mas/yr
Parallax (π)	19.5911±0.0702 mas
Distance	166.5 ± 0.6 ly (51.0 ± 0.2 pc)
Absolute magnitude (M_{V})	2.08

Details
Mass	1.47 M_{☉}
Radius	2.35+0.34 −0.13 R_{☉}
Luminosity	11.585±0.054 L_{☉}
Surface gravity (log g)	3.88 cgs
Temperature	7,070±240 K
Metallicity [Fe/H]	−0.29 dex
Rotational velocity (v sin i)	72.5 km/s
Age	1.166 Gyr

Other designations
- 40 Boo, BD+39°2820, FK5 3182, HD 132772, HIP 73369, HR 5588, SAO 64449

Database references
SIMBAD	data

40 Boötis is a single star located 166.5 light years away from the Sun in the northern constellation of Boötes. It is visible to the naked eye as a dim, yellow-white hued star with an apparent visual magnitude of 5.64. The star is moving away from the Earth with a heliocentric radial velocity of +12 km/s.

The Hipparcos catalogue (1997) lists a stellar classification of F1 III–IV, matching the luminosity class of an aging star that is evolving into a giant. Earlier, Cowley and Bidelman (1979) listed a class of F2 III, while Sato and Kuji (1990) found a main sequence class of F0V. It is around 1.2 billion years old with a relatively high rotation rate, showing a projected rotational velocity of 72.5 km/s. The star has 1.5 times the mass of the Sun and 2.4 times the Sun's radius. It is radiating 11.6 times the luminosity of the Sun from its photosphere at an effective temperature of 7,070 K.
