= 14 Boötis =

Possible binary star system in the constellation Boötes

Observation data Epoch J2000 Equinox ICRS
- Constellation: Boötes
- Right ascension: 14^{h} 14^{m} 05.17971^{s}
- Declination: +12° 57′ 33.9997″
- Apparent magnitude (V): 5.53

Characteristics
- Spectral type: F8 V
- B−V color index: 0.55

Astrometry
Radial velocity (R_{v})	−39.6±0.1 km/s
Proper motion (μ)	RA: −253.97 mas/yr Dec.: −54.47 mas/yr
Parallax (π)	29.7478±0.1000 mas
Distance	109.6 ± 0.4 ly (33.6 ± 0.1 pc)
Absolute magnitude (M_{V})	2.92

Details

14 Boötis A
Mass	1.46 M_{☉}
Radius	2.12+0.06 −0.03 R_{☉}
Luminosity	5.879+0.024 −0.026 L_{☉}
Surface gravity (log g)	3.85±0.10 cgs
Temperature	6,169+53 −81 K
Metallicity [Fe/H]	0.07±0.10 dex
Rotation	26
Rotational velocity (v sin i)	5.6 km/s
Age	2.60 Gyr

Other designations
- 14 Boo, BD+13°2764, HD 124570, HIP 69536, HR 5323, SAO 100925, WDS J14141+1258AB, LTT 14163

Database references
SIMBAD	data

14 Boötis is a possible binary star system located 110 light years away from the Sun in the northern constellation of Boötes. It is visible to the naked eye as a dim, yellow-white hued star with a combined apparent visual magnitude of 5.53. This system is moving closer to the Earth with a heliocentric radial velocity of −40 km/s. It has a relatively high proper motion, traversing the celestial sphere at the rate of 0.260 arc seconds per annum.

The component of this system remain unresolved as of 2002; Eggleton and Tokovinin (2008) listed an angular separation of 0.2″. The visible component is an F-type main-sequence star with a stellar classification of F8 V There are enhanced barium lines in the star's spectrum, but these are likely caused by regions of photospheric activity rather than being a barium star. It is 2.6 billion years old and is spinning with a projected rotational velocity of 5.6 km/s, giving it a rotation period of 26 days.

14 Boötis has 1.46 times the mass of the Sun and 2.1 times the Sun's radius. It is radiating 5.9 times the luminosity of the Sun from its photosphere at an effective temperature of 6,169 K. The metallicity is near solar, based on the abundance of iron in the stellar atmosphere.
