= 18 Boötis =

Star in the constellation Boötes

Observation data Epoch J2000 Equinox ICRS
- Constellation: Boötes
- Right ascension: 14^{h} 19^{m} 16.27966^{s}
- Declination: +13° 00′ 15.4859″
- Apparent magnitude (V): 5.41

Characteristics
- Spectral type: F3 V
- B−V color index: 0.385±0.011

Astrometry
Radial velocity (R_{v})	−0.40±0.7 km/s
Proper motion (μ)	RA: +105.273 mas/yr Dec.: −31.389 mas/yr
Parallax (π)	38.1262±0.1323 mas
Distance	85.5 ± 0.3 ly (26.23 ± 0.09 pc)
Absolute magnitude (M_{V})	3.33

Details
Mass	1.31 M_{☉}
Radius	1.4 R_{☉}
Luminosity	3.90 L_{☉}
Surface gravity (log g)	4.30 cgs
Temperature	6,731±229 K
Metallicity [Fe/H]	−0.03±0.04 dex
Rotational velocity (v sin i)	40.5±2.0 km/s
Age	1.154 Gyr

Other designations
- 18 Boo, BD+13°2782, FK5 1372, GJ 3841, HD 125451, HIP 69989, HR 5365, SAO 100975, WDS J14193+1300

Database references
SIMBAD	data

18 Boötis is a single star in the northern constellation of Boötes, located about 85 light years away from the Sun. It is visible to the naked eye as a faint, yellow-white hued star with an apparent visual magnitude of 5.41. This object is a suspected member of the Ursa Major Moving Group, based on velocity criteria. It has a magnitude 10.84 optical companion at an angular separation of 163.7″ along a position angle of 219°, as of 2010.

This is an F-type main-sequence star with a stellar classification of F3 V. Older surveys gave a class of F5 IV, showing the luminosity class of a subgiant star. It shows strong evidence for short-term chromospheric variability, although it is not optically variable.

18 Boötis is an estimated 1.15 billion years old and is spinning with a projected rotational velocity of 40.5 km/s. It has 1.3 times the mass of the Sun and 1.4 times the Sun's radius. The star is radiating 3.9 times the luminosity of the Sun from its photosphere at an effective temperature of 6,731 K. An infrared excess has been detected that suggests a cold debris disk is orbiting 34.9 AU from the host star with a blackbody temperature fit of 65 K.
