= Ursa Major moving group =

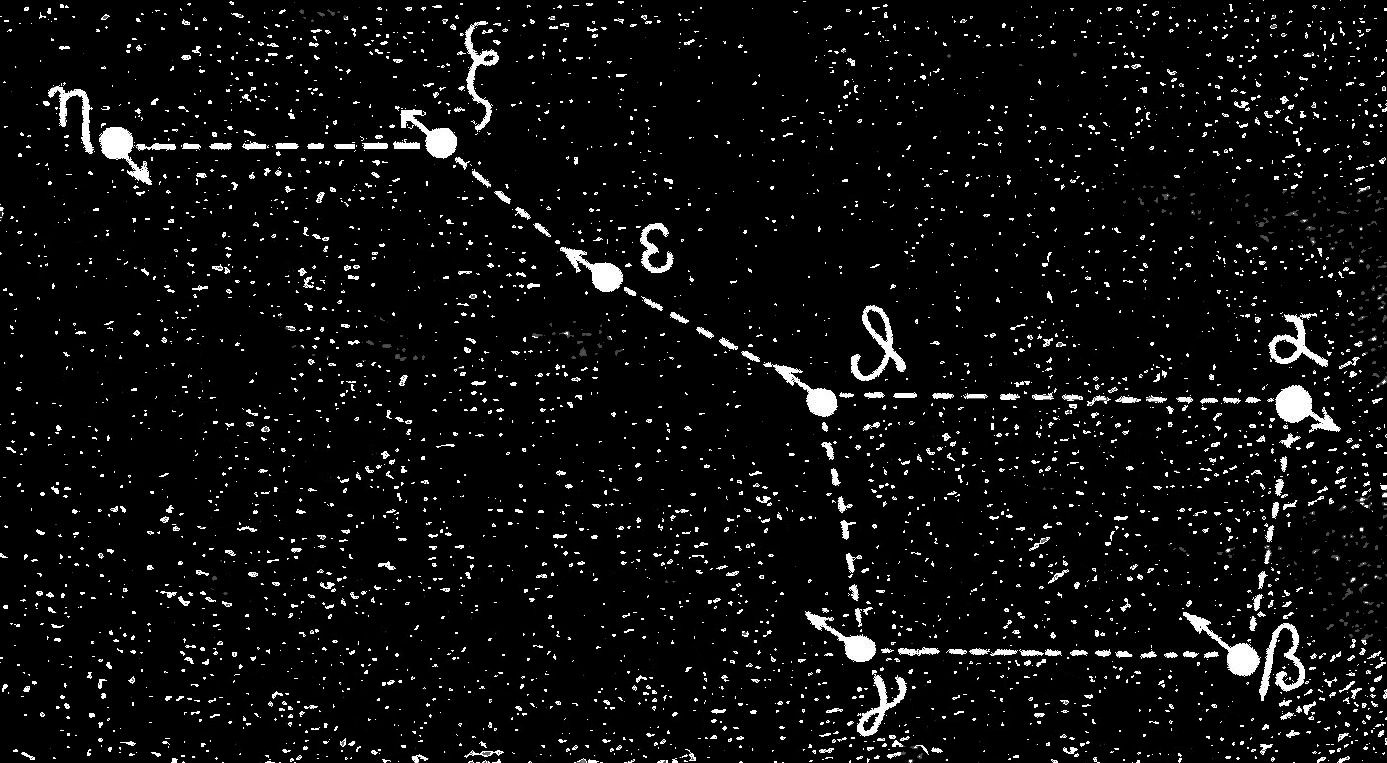
Early illustration showing how many of the stars in Ursa Major move in a group

The Ursa Major Moving Group, also known as Collinder 285 and the Ursa Major association, is the closest stellar moving group – a set of stars with common velocities in space and thought to have a common origin in space and time. In the case of the Ursa Major group, all the stars formed about 400 million years ago. Its core is roughly 80 light years away and part of the Local Bubble. It is rich in prominent stars including most of the stars of the Big Dipper.

== Discovery and constituents ==
All stars in the Ursa Major Moving Group are moving in roughly the same direction at similar velocities, and also have similar chemical compositions and estimated ages. This evidence suggests to astronomers that the stars in the group share a common origin.

Based on the numbers of its constituent stars, the Ursa Major Moving Group is believed to have once been an open cluster, having formed from a protostellar nebula approximately 418 million years ago. Since then, the sparse group has scattered over a region about 30 by 18 light-years, whose center is currently about 80 light-years away, making it the closest cluster-like object to Earth.

The Ursa Major Moving Group was discovered in 1869 by Richard A. Proctor, who noticed that, except for Dubhe and Alkaid (Eta Ursae Majoris), the stars of the Big Dipper asterism all have proper motions heading towards a common point in Sagittarius. Thus, the Big Dipper, unlike most constellations or asterisms, is largely composed of related stars (another example of which would be Taurus).

Some of the brighter stream members include Alpha Coronae Borealis (α CrB or Alphecca or Gemma), Beta Aurigae (β Aur), Delta Aquarii (δ Aqr), Gamma Leporis (γ Lep) and Beta Serpentis (β Ser). More bright and moderately bright stars which are currently believed to be members of the group are listed below.

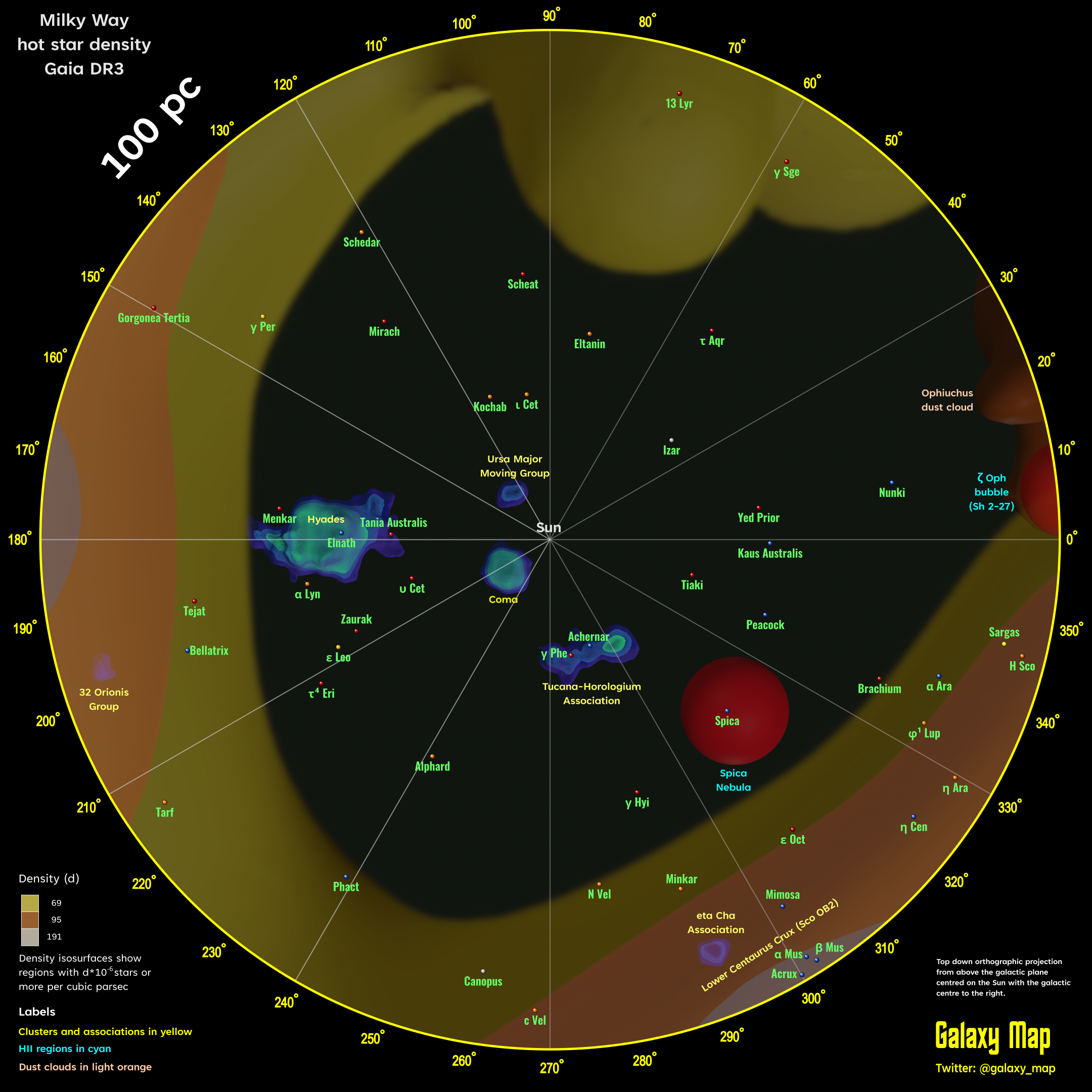
Map of stars and open clusters within 100 parsecs of the Sun. The Ursa moving group is near the center at 120° galactic longitude.

== Proper motions visualised ==
Over the years the proper motions of the stars change the visual appearance of the bright asterism familiar to any star gazer and the content in fainter stars of the starfield surrounding it. This is visible in the animation extending from 200,000 years BP to 200,000 years in the future including all the stars brighter than magnitude V = 9. Positions, parallaxes, proper motions and radial velocities are from the 3rd Data Release of the European Space Agency's Gaia mission. Size of the stars in the image are smaller with the increasing magnitude and the colours are determined by the stars spectral type based on the "B−V" colour index. The majority of the stars are red stars of the main-sequence, a very general feature in the Milky Way.

The common velocity of five stars of the Plough is clearly visible in the animation and more fainter stars are also sharing this motion. At the angle of the handle, the relative displacement of Mizar and Alcor as well that of a fainter and close companion of Mizar is also noticeable.

Motion of the bright stars (V < 9) in Ursa Major over 400,000 years, showing the change of shape of the plough. Astronomical data from the DR3 of the Gaia astrometry mission of the European Space Agency.

== Group members ==
Current criteria for membership in the moving group is based on the stars' motion in space. This motion can be determined from the proper motions and parallax (or distance) to the stars and radial velocities. A study published in 2003 using data gathered by the Hipparcos satellite (1989–1993) greatly improved both the proper motion and parallax estimates of nearby bright stars, refining the study of this and other moving groups.

Based on their distances (measured with Hipparcos) and apparent magnitude, the absolute magnitude can be used to estimate the age of the stars. The stars in the moving group appear to have a common age of about 500 million years.

=== Core stars ===
The core of the moving group consists of 14 stars, of which 13 are in the constellation Ursa Major and the other is in the neighboring Canes Venatici. The average apparent magnitude of all 14 core stars is approximately 4.42. None of these stars are hotter than spectral class A, but stream stars may be more massive and hotter.

The following are members of the moving group closest to its center. These stars are all in Ursa Major except where indicated.

Name	Constellation	B	F	HD	HIP	vis. mag.	Dist. (ly)	Sp. class	Notes
ε UMa	Ursa Major	ε	77	112185	62956	1.76	81	A0p	Alioth
ζ UMa A	Ursa Major	ζ	79	116656	65378	2.23	78	A2V	Mizar, Mizat, Mirza, Mitsar, Vasistha (quadruple system)
β UMa	Ursa Major	β	48	95418	53910	2.34	79	A1V	Merak, Mirak
γ UMa	Ursa Major	γ	64	103287	58001	2.41	84	A0V SB	Phad, Phecda, Phegda, Phekha, Phacd
δ UMa	Ursa Major	δ	69	106591	59774	3.32	81	A3V	Megrez, Kaffa
ζ UMa B	Ursa Major	ζ	79	116657		3.95			Part of Mizar quadruple system
80 UMa	Ursa Major	g	80	116842	65477	3.99	81	A5V SB	Alcor, Saidak, Suha, Arundhati (binary system)
78 UMa	Ursa Major		78	113139	63503	4.93	81	F2V	
37 UMa	Ursa Major		37	91480	51814	5.16	86	F1V	
HD 115043	Ursa Major			115043	64532	6.82	84	G1V	Gliese 503.2
HD 109011	Ursa Major			109011	61100	8.10	77	K2V	NO UMa
HD 110463	Ursa Major			110463	61946	8.28	76	K3V	NP UMa
HD 109647	Canes Venatici			109647	61481	8.53	86	K0	DO CVn

=== Stream stars ===
There is also a "stream" of stars which are likely members of the Ursa Major Moving Group, scattered more widely across the sky (from Cepheus to Triangulum Australe).

Name	Constellation	B	F	HD	HIP	vis. mag.	Dist. (ly)	Sp. class	Notes
β Aur	Auriga	β	34	40183	28360	1.90	82	A2V	Menkalinan, Menkalina
α CrB	Corona Borealis	α	5	139006	76267	2.22	75	A0V	Alphecca, Alphacca, Alphekka, Gemma, Gnosia, Gnosia Stella Coronae, Asteroth, Ashtaroth
δ Aqr	Aquarius	δ	76	216627	113136	3.27	159	A3V	Skat, Scheat, Seat, Sheat
ζ Leo	Leo	ζ	36	89025	50335	3.43	260	F0III	Adhafera, Aldhafera, Aldhafara
γ Lep A	Lepus	γ	13	38393	27072	3.59	29	F7V	
β Ser	Serpens	β	28	141003	77233	3.65	153	A3V	Zhou
ζ Boo A	Boötes	ζ	30	129246	71795	3.78	180	A3IVn	
χ^{1} Ori	Orion	χ^{1}	54	39587	27913	4.39	28	G0V	
ζ Boo B	Boötes	ζ	30	129247		4.43	180	A2III	
21 LMi	Leo Minor		21	87696	49593	4.49	91	A7V	
χ Cet A	Cetus	χ	53	11171	8497	4.66	77	F3III	
γ Mic	Microscopium	γ	39	199951	103738	4.67	223	G8III	
ζ Crt	Crater	ζ	27	102070	57283	4.71	350	G8III	
ζ TrA	Triangulum Australe	ζ	31	147584	80686	4.90	39	F9V	
16 Lyr	Lyra		16	177196	93408	5.00	128	A7V	
66 Tau	Taurus	r	66	27820	20522	5.10	396	A3V	
59 Dra	Draco		59	180777	94083	5.11	89	A9V	
89 Psc	Pisces	f	89	7804	6061	5.13	220	A3V	
HD 75605	Pyxis			75605	43352	5.19	229	G8III	
HD 27022	Camelopardalis			27022	20266	5.27	340	G4III or G5IIb	
18 Boo	Boötes		18	125451	69989	5.41	85	F5IV	
HD 109799	Hydra			109799	61621	5.41	113	F0V	
π^{1} UMa	Ursa Major	π^{1}	3	72905	42438	5.63	47	G1.5Vb	Muscida
HD 220096	Sculptor			220096	115312	5.65	329	G5IV	
29 Com	Coma Berenices		29	111397	62541	5.71	402	A1V	
HD 18778	Cepheus			18778	14844	5.92	202	A7III-IV	
HD 165185	Sagittarius			165185	88694	5.94	57	G3V	Gliese 702.1
6 Sex	Sextans		6	85364	48341	6.01	200	A8III	
HD 171746	Hercules			171746	91159	6.21	112	G2Vv comp	
HD 26932	Taurus			26932		6.23	69	G0IV	
HD 129798	Draco			129798	71876	6.24	139	F2V	DL Dra
41 Vir	Virgo		41	112097	62933	6.25	199	A7III	
χ Cet B	Cetus	χ	53	11131	8486	6.72	78	G0	EZ Cet
HD 71974 A	Lynx			71974	41820	7.51	94	G5	
HD 59747	Lynx			59747	36704	7.70	64	G5	DX Lyn
HD 28495	Camelopardalis			28495	21276	7.76	90	G0	MS Cam
HD 173950	Lyra			173950	92122	8.08	121	G5	V595 Lyr
HIP 66459	Canes Venatici				66459	9.06	36	K5	Gliese 519
HD 71974 B	Lynx			71974	41820	9.09	94		
HD 95650	Leo			95650	53985	9.68	38	M0	DS Leo, Gliese 410
HD 238224	Ursa Major			238224	65327	9.72	82	K5	Gliese 509.1
HD 13959	Cetus			13959	10552	9.76	124	K2	Gliese 91.1
HD 156498	Ophiuchus			156498	84595	9.98	271	G5	V2369 Oph

=== Non-members ===
The Big Dipper stars Dubhe (α UMa) and Alkaid (η UMa) are not members of the group, both being somewhat further away and moving in very different directions.

The bright, nearby star Sirius was long believed to be a member of the group, but may not be, according to research in 2003 by Jeremy King et al. at Clemson University. This research seems to indicate that it is too young to be a member, and is moving in the same direction as the group by mere coincidence.

The Solar System is in the outskirts of this stream, but is not a member, being about 15 times older. The Sun drifted in along its 250-million-year galactic orbit, and 40 million years ago was not near the Ursa Major group.

== See also ==
- List of nearby stellar associations and moving groups
- β Pictoris moving group
- AB Doradus moving group
