= Epsilon Boötis =

Double star in Boötes

ε Boötis
- Location of ε Boötis (circled)

Observation data Epoch J2000 Equinox ICRS
- Constellation: Boötes
- A
- Right ascension: 14^{h} 44^{m} 59.218^{s}
- Declination: +27° 04′ 27.2″
- Apparent magnitude (V): 2.45

Characteristics
- Evolutionary stage: red giant branch
- Spectral type: K0 II-III + A2 V
- U−B color index: +0.73
- B−V color index: +0.97

Astrometry
Absolute magnitude (M_{V})	−1.61

A
Radial velocity (R_{v})	−16.31 km/s
Proper motion (μ)	RA: −50.818 mas/yr Dec.: +21.024 mas/yr
Parallax (π)	13.8267±0.4896 mas
Distance	236 ± 8 ly (72 ± 3 pc)

Details

A
Mass	5.36±0.48 M_{☉}
Radius	37.61+1.29 −1.38 R_{☉}
Luminosity	652.5±58.7 L_{☉}
Surface gravity (log g)	2.24 cgs
Temperature	4,755±46 K
Metallicity [Fe/H]	−0.13 dex
Rotational velocity (v sin i)	10.9 km/s

B
Mass	2.270±0.332 M_{☉}
Radius	2.747±0.171 R_{☉}
Luminosity	44.8±4.0 L_{☉}
Surface gravity (log g)	3.92±0.09 cgs
Temperature	9009±375 K
Metallicity [Fe/H]	−0.20 dex
Rotational velocity (v sin i)	123 km/s

Other designations
- ε Boo, 36 Boo, BD+27°2417, HIP 72105
- A: Izar, HD 129989, HR 5506, SAO 83500
- B: Pulcherrima, HD 129988, HR 5505

Database references
SIMBAD	Epsilon Boo A
- Epsilon Boo B

Epsilon Boötis is a binary star system in the northern constellation of Boötes. The two components have the proper names Izar (/ˈaɪzɑːr/, EYE-zar) and Pulcherrima (/pəlˈkɛrɪmə/) respectively; both are traditional names for the system. The star system can be viewed with the unaided eye at night, but resolving the pair with a small telescope is challenging; an aperture of 76 mm (3.0 in) or greater is required. Based on parallax measurements, it is located at a distance of 236 light-years (72 pc). The system is drifting closer to the Sun with a radial velocity of −16 km/s.

== Nomenclature ==
Epsilon Boötis is a Bayer designation that is Latinized from ε Boötis, and abbreviated Epsilon Boo or ε Boo.

It bore the traditional names Izar, Mirak and Mizar, and was named Pulcherrima by Friedrich Georg Wilhelm von Struve. Izar, and Mizar are from the Arabic: إزار ʾizār and مئزر Mi'zar ('kilt like undergarment') and المراق al-maraqq' ('the loins'); Pulcherrima is Latin for 'loveliest', in reference to the pair's contrasting colors. In 2016, the International Astronomical Union organized a Working Group on Star Names (WGSN) to catalogue and standardize proper names for stars. The WGSN approved the name Izar for Epsilon Boötis A on 21 August 2016, and later approved the name Pulcherrima for Epsilon Boötis B on 15 April 2026.

In the catalogue of stars in the Calendarium of Al Achsasi Al Mouakket, this star was designated Mintek al Aoua (منطقة العوّاء minṭáqa al awwa), which was translated into Latin as Cingulum Latratoris, meaning 'belt of barker'.

In Chinese astronomy, 梗河 Gěng Hé ('Celestial Lance'), refers to an asterism consisting of Epsilon Boötis, Sigma Boötis and Rho Boötis. Consequently, the Chinese name for Epsilon Boötis itself is 梗河一 Gěng Hé yī ('the First Star of Celestial Lance').

== Properties ==
Epsilon Boötis consists of a pair of stars with an angular separation of 2.852 ± 0.014 arcseconds at a position angle of 342.9°±0.3°. The brighter component (A) has an apparent visual magnitude of 2.45, making it readily visible to the naked eye at night. The fainter component (B) is at magnitude 4.8, which by itself would also be visible to the naked eye. Parallax measurements from the Hipparcos astrometry satellite put the system at a distance of about 203 light-years (62 parsecs) from the Earth. This means the pair has a projected separation of 185 astronomical units, and they orbit each other with a period of at least 1,000 years.

The brighter member has a stellar classification of K0 II-III, which means it is a fairly late-stage star well into its stellar evolution, having already exhausted its supply of hydrogen fuel at the core. Evolutionary models suggest it is on the red giant branch, where hydrogen is being fused in a shell around a helium core. With more than four times the mass of the Sun, it has expanded to about 38 times the Sun's radius and is emitting 650 times the luminosity of the Sun. This energy is being radiated from its outer envelope at an effective temperature of 4,755 K, giving it the orange hue of a K-type star.

The companion star has a classification of A2 V, so it is a main sequence star that is generating energy through the thermonuclear fusion of hydrogen at its core. This star is rotating rapidly, with a projected rotational velocity of 123 km/s. It has a surface temperature of about 9,000 K and a radius nearly three times the Sun, leading to a bolometric luminosity 45 times that of the Sun.

Epsilon Boötis may turn out to be a quadruple system. A widely-separated brown dwarf appears to have similar proper motions with the inner pair, and thus astronomers believe both bodies may be gravitationally related. The estimated separation is of 4,900 astronomical units, but this is actually a projected separation, thus a lower limit. In addition, there is another proper motion companion at a much wider projected separation of 186,000 AU.

By the time the smaller main sequence star reaches the current point of the primary in its evolution, the larger star will have lost much of its mass in a planetary nebula and will have evolved into a white dwarf. The pair will have essentially changed roles: the brighter star becoming the dim dwarf, while the lesser companion will shine as a giant star.

== In culture ==
In 1973, the Scottish astronomer and science fiction writer Duncan Lunan claimed to have managed to interpret a message caught in the 1920s by two Norwegian physicists that, according to his theory, came from a 13,000 year old satellite polar orbiting the Earth known as the Black Knight and sent there by the inhabitants of a planet orbiting Epsilon Boötis. The story was even reported in Time magazine. Lunan later withdrew his Epsilon Boötis theory, presenting proofs against it and clarifying why he was brought to formulate it in the first place, but later revoked his withdrawal.

== Gallery ==
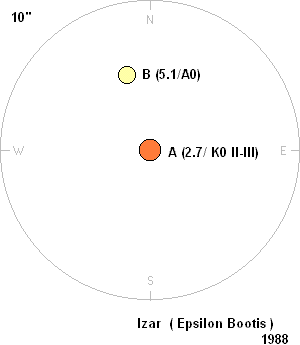
Illustration of the two components of Epsilon Boötis (north is up)

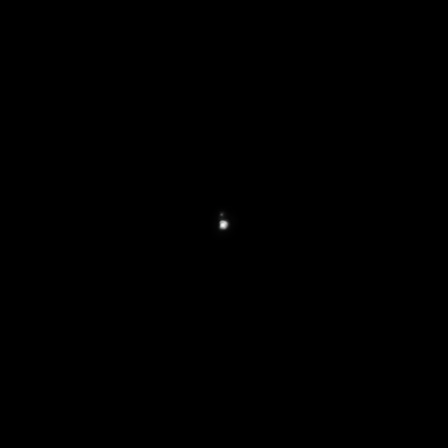
Epsilon Bootis (Izar) as seen in a small telescope
