= List of stars in Boötes =

This is the list of notable stars in the constellation Boötes, sorted by decreasing brightness. The genitive for stars in this constellation is Boötis and the IAU abbreviation is Boo. Hence, η Boo is Eta Boötis.

Name	B	F	G.	Var	HD	HIP	RA	Dec	vis. mag.	abs. mag.	Dist. (ly)	Sp. class	Notes
Arcturus	α	16			124897	69673	14^{h} 15^{m} 40.35^{s}	+19° 11′ 14.2″	−0.05	−0.31	37	K2IIIp	Alramech, Al Simak Al Ramih, Al Simak Lanceator; 3rd brightest star, variable
ε Boo	ε	36			129989	72105	14^{h} 44^{m} 59.22^{s}	+27° 04′ 27.2″	2.37	−1.61	236	K0 II-III	Izar (A), Mirak, Pulcherrima (B) binary star
η Boo	η	8			121370	67927	13^{h} 54^{m} 41.12^{s}	+18° 23′ 54.9″	2.68	2.41	37	G0IV	Muphrid, Ramih al Ramih, Lancea Lanceator
γ Boo	γ	27			127762	71075	14^{h} 32^{m} 04.76^{s}	+38° 18′ 28.4″	3.04	0.96	85	A7IIIvar	Seginus, Menkib al Aoua al Aisr, Humerus Sinister Latratoris; δ Sct variable, V_{max} = 3.02^{m}, V_{min} = 3.07^{m}, P = 0.290314 d
δ Boo	δ	49			135722	74666	15^{h} 15^{m} 30.10^{s}	+33° 18′ 54.4″	3.46	0.69	117	G8III	Qigong, Princeps.
β Boo	β	42			133208	73555	15^{h} 01^{m} 56.79^{s}	+40° 23′ 26.3″	3.49	−0.64	219	G8III	Nekkar, Meres
ρ Boo	ρ	25			127665	71053	14^{h} 31^{m} 49.86^{s}	+30° 22′ 16.1″	3.57	0.27	149	K3III	Kalasungsang
ζ Boo	ζ	30			129246	71795	14^{h} 41^{m} 08.92^{s}	+13° 43′ 42.0″	3.78	0.06	180	A3IVn	double star
θ Boo	θ	23			126660	70497	14^{h} 25^{m} 12.02^{s}	+51° 51′ 06.2″	4.04	3.22	48	F7V	Asellus Primus
υ Boo	υ	5			120477	67459	13^{h} 49^{m} 28.70^{s}	+15° 47′ 52.1″	4.05	−0.33	245	K5IIIvar	
λ Boo	λ	19			125162	69732	14^{h} 16^{m} 23.18^{s}	+46° 05′ 16.5″	4.18	1.81	97	A0sh	Xuángē (玄戈)
μ^{1} Boo	μ^{1}	51			137391	75411	15^{h} 24^{m} 29.54^{s}	+37° 22′ 37.1″	4.31	1.46	121	F0V	Alkalurops; double star
ζ Boo	ζ	30			129247		14^{h} 41^{m} 08.90^{s}	+13° 43′ 42.0″	4.43				
σ Boo	σ	28			128167	71284	14^{h} 34^{m} 40.69^{s}	+29° 44′ 41.3″	4.47	3.52	50	F3Vwvar	Genghe
π^{1} Boo	π^{1}	29			129174	71762	14^{h} 40^{m} 43.56^{s}	+16° 25′ 05.9″	4.49	−0.45	317	B9p MnHg	Alazal; binary star
τ Boo	τ	4			120136	67275	13^{h} 47^{m} 16.04^{s}	+17° 27′ 24.4″	4.50	3.53	51	F7V	Tepiamenit, has a planet (b)
ψ Boo	ψ	43			133582	73745	15^{h} 04^{m} 26.86^{s}	+26° 56′ 51.6″	4.52	0.10	250	K2III	
κ^{2} Boo	κ^{2}	17			124675	69483	14^{h} 13^{m} 28.95^{s}	+51° 47′ 24.0″	4.53	1.14	155	A8IV	Asellus Tertius; binary star; δ Sct variable, V_{max} = 4.50^{m}, V_{min} = 4.58^{m}, P = 0.06479 d
ξ Boo	ξ	37			131156	72659	14^{h} 51^{m} 23.28^{s}	+19° 06′ 02.3″	4.54	5.41	22	G8V + K4V	BY Dra variable, V_{max} = 4.52^{m}, V_{min} = 4.67^{m}, P = 10.137 d
ο Boo	ο	35			129972	72125	14^{h} 45^{m} 14.50^{s}	+16° 57′ 51.9″	4.60	0.40	225	K0III	
ι Boo	ι	21			125161	69713	14^{h} 16^{m} 10.07^{s}	+51° 22′ 01.3″	4.75	2.38	97	A9V	Asellus Secundus; binary star, triple star; δ Sct variable, V_{max} = 4.73^{m}, V_{min} = 4.78^{m}, P = 0.027 d
HD 125351	A				125351	69879	14^{h} 17^{m} 59.82^{s}	+35° 30′ 34.1″	4.80	0.63	223	K1III	spectroscopic binary
W Boo		34			129712	71995	14^{h} 43^{m} 25.37^{s}	+26° 31′ 40.4″	4.80	−2.38	888	M3III	Alrumh, semiregular variable, V_{max} = 4.49^{m}, V_{min} = 5.40^{m}, P = 25 d
ω Boo	ω	41			133124	73568	15^{h} 02^{m} 06.51^{s}	+25° 00′ 29.7″	4.80	−0.41	359	K4III	
12 Boo	d	12			123999	69226	14^{h} 10^{m} 23.95^{s}	+25° 05′ 30.6″	4.82	2.00	120	F9IVw	
44 Boo	i	44			133640	73695	15^{h} 03^{m} 47.68^{s}	+47° 39′ 14.5″	4.83	4.30	42	G2V + G2V	Quadrans, W UMa variable, V_{max} = 4.70^{m}, V_{min} = 4.86^{m}, P = 0.267819 d
20 Boo		20			125560	70027	14^{h} 19^{m} 45.32^{s}	+16° 18′ 24.5″	4.84	1.01	190	K3III	
HD 126128					126128	70327	14^{h} 23^{m} 22.74^{s}	+08° 26′ 47.9″	4.86	0.76	215	A0V	forms a triple star with HD 126129
31 Boo		31	6		129312	71832	14^{h} 41^{m} 38.76^{s}	+08° 09′ 42.3″	4.86	−1.38	576	G8IIIvar	
6 Boo	e	6			120539	67480	13^{h} 49^{m} 42.82^{s}	+21° 15′ 50.6″	4.92	−0.34	368	K4III	
45 Boo	c	45			134083	73996	15^{h} 07^{m} 17.95^{s}	+24° 52′ 10.5″	4.93	3.46	64	F5V	
ν^{2} Boo	ν^{2} (Note: Also designated Psi Herculis (ψ Herculis) by Bayer)	53			138629	76041	15^{h} 31^{m} 46.99^{s}	+40° 53′ 57.7″	4.98	−0.62	430	A5V	
9 Boo		9			121710	68103	13^{h} 56^{m} 34.16^{s}	+27° 29′ 31.9″	5.02	−1.47	648	K3IIIvar	
ν^{1} Boo	ν^{1}	52			138481	75973	15^{h} 30^{m} 55.75^{s}	+40° 49′ 59.0″	5.04	−2.10	872	K5III	
HD 126129			3		126129		14^{h} 23^{m} 22.70^{s}	+08° 26′ 47.8″	5.04	+0.5	215	A0V	forms a triple star with HD 126128
BY Boo				BY	123657	69038	14^{h} 07^{m} 55.75^{s}	+43° 51′ 16.3″	5.13	−0.64	465	M4.5:III	irregular variable, V_{max} = 4.98^{m}, V_{min} = 5.33^{m}
					134190	73909	15^{h} 06^{m} 16.67^{s}	+54° 33′ 22.6″	5.24	0.73	260	G8III	
φ Boo	φ	54			139641	76534	15^{h} 37^{m} 49.55^{s}	+40° 21′ 11.8″	5.25	1.76	163	G8III-IV	Ceginus
CF Boo		13		CF	123782	69068	14^{h} 08^{m} 17.36^{s}	+49° 27′ 28.9″	5.26	−0.90	556	M2III	irregular variable, V_{max} = 5.20^{m}, V_{min} = 5.30^{m}
χ Boo	χ	48			135502	74596	15^{h} 14^{m} 29.21^{s}	+29° 09′ 51.2″	5.28	1.07	226	A2V	
15 Boo		15			124679	69612	14^{h} 14^{m} 50.86^{s}	+10° 06′ 03.6″	5.29	0.82	255	K1III	
50 Boo		50			136849	75178	15^{h} 21^{m} 48.61^{s}	+32° 56′ 01.2″	5.38	0.98	247	B9Vn	
33 Boo		33			129002	71618	14^{h} 38^{m} 50.28^{s}	+44° 24′ 16.4″	5.39	1.49	197	A1V	
22 Boo	f	22			126661	70602	14^{h} 26^{m} 27.41^{s}	+19° 13′ 36.6″	5.40	0.68	286	F0m	
18 Boo		18			125451	69989	14^{h} 19^{m} 16.22^{s}	+13° 00′ 15.8″	5.41	3.33	85	F5IV	
					137704	75572	15^{h} 26^{m} 17.46^{s}	+34° 20′ 09.1″	5.46	−0.42	489	K4III	
					131111	72582	14^{h} 50^{m} 29.80^{s}	+37° 16′ 18.5″	5.47	1.53	200	K0III-IV	
BP Boo				BP	140728	76957	15^{h} 42^{m} 50.82^{s}	+52° 21′ 39.0″	5.48	0.54	317	B9p...	α^{2} CVn variable, ΔV = 0.02^{m}, P = 1.30488 d
					133392	73634	15^{h} 03^{m} 06.08^{s}	+35° 12′ 20.8″	5.52	0.89	275	G8III:	
14 Boo		14			124570	69536	14^{h} 14^{m} 05.33^{s}	+12° 57′ 34.5″	5.53	2.92	108	F6IV	
32 Boo		32			129336	71837	14^{h} 41^{m} 43.62^{s}	+11° 39′ 39.4″	5.55	0.19	385	G8III	
					137071	75257	15^{h} 22^{m} 37.37^{s}	+39° 34′ 53.4″	5.56	−3.99	2650	K4III	
HD 118889					118889	66640	13^{h} 39^{m} 34.68^{s}	+10° 44′ 46.7″	5.57	1.93	175	F0V	
24 Boo	g	24			127243	70791	14^{h} 28^{m} 38.09^{s}	+49° 50′ 41.9″	5.58	0.70	308	G3IV	has a planet (b)
47 Boo	k	47			133962	73841	15^{h} 05^{m} 25.89^{s}	+48° 09′ 03.2″	5.59	1.08	260	A1V	
2 Boo		2			119126	66763	13^{h} 41^{m} 02.36^{s}	+22° 29′ 45.0″	5.63	0.66	322	G9III	
					132254	73100	14^{h} 56^{m} 22.94^{s}	+49° 37′ 44.4″	5.63	3.65	81	F7V	
40 Boo		40			132772	73369	14^{h} 59^{m} 36.97^{s}	+39° 15′ 54.8″	5.64	2.13	164	F1III-IV	
					136729	75043	15^{h} 20^{m} 05.14^{s}	+51° 57′ 30.6″	5.65	1.58	213	A4V	
46 Boo	b	46			134320	74087	15^{h} 08^{m} 23.78^{s}	+26° 18′ 04.3″	5.67	0.12	420	K2III	
39 Boo		39			131041	72524	14^{h} 49^{m} 41.36^{s}	+48° 43′ 14.0″	5.68	1.44	229	F6V+...	
7 Boo		7			121107	67787	13^{h} 53^{m} 12.95^{s}	+17° 55′ 58.3″	5.71	−0.90	683	G5III	
					118508	66417	13^{h} 36^{m} 59.10^{s}	+24° 36′ 47.9″	5.72	−0.23	505	M2III	
					129846	72012	14^{h} 43^{m} 44.44^{s}	+40° 27′ 33.1″	5.72	−1.21	793	K4III	
					132146	73166	14^{h} 57^{m} 11.68^{s}	+16° 23′ 17.3″	5.72	−0.67	617	G5III:	
1 Boo		1			119055	66727	13^{h} 40^{m} 40.50^{s}	+19° 57′ 20.4″	5.73	0.89	303	A1V	
CH Boo				CH	128333	71280	14^{h} 34^{m} 39.66^{s}	+49° 22′ 05.6″	5.74	−1.16	782	M1III	irregular variable, ΔV = ~0.04^{m}
					128902	71568	14^{h} 38^{m} 12.67^{s}	+43° 38′ 31.4″	5.74	−1.99	1144	K2III	
10 Boo		10			121996	68276	13^{h} 58^{m} 38.93^{s}	+21° 41′ 46.8″	5.76	−0.08	480	A0Vs	
38 Boo	h	38			130945	72487	14^{h} 49^{m} 18.68^{s}	+46° 06′ 59.0″	5.76	2.41	153	F7IVw	Merga
					139798	76568	15^{h} 38^{m} 16.14^{s}	+46° 47′ 52.8″	5.76	2.99	117	F2V	
EK Boo				EK	130144	72208	14^{h} 46^{m} 06.00^{s}	+15° 07′ 54.3″	5.78	−1.44	908	M5III	irregular variable, ΔV = ~0.38^{m}
					130917	72552	14^{h} 49^{m} 58.39^{s}	+28° 36′ 57.0″	5.80	1.02	295	A4V	
					134335	74096	15^{h} 08^{m} 35.56^{s}	+25° 06′ 31.1″	5.82	−0.15	510	K1III	
					128998	71573	14^{h} 38^{m} 15.21^{s}	+54° 01′ 24.2″	5.83	0.24	428	A1V	
CY Boo				CY	125180	69829	14^{h} 17^{m} 28.44^{s}	+15° 15′ 48.1″	5.84	−1.62	1012	M3III	= 101 Vir; semiregular variable, V_{max} = 5.74^{m}, V_{min} = 5.90^{m}, P = 23 d
					139906	76594	15^{h} 38^{m} 34.20^{s}	+50° 25′ 24.1″	5.84	0.54	374	G8III	
HP Boo				HP	130948	72567	14^{h} 50^{m} 15.72^{s}	+23° 54′ 42.4″	5.86	4.59	58	G2V	BY Draconis variable, ΔV = 0.03^{m}, P = 7.85 d
π^{2} Boo	π^{2}	29			129175		14^{h} 40^{m} 43.90^{s}	+16° 25′ 04.0″	5.88				component of the π Boo system
					128750	71571	14^{h} 38^{m} 14.01^{s}	+18° 17′ 54.7″	5.90	0.64	367	K2III:	
					131951	73087	14^{h} 56^{m} 13.24^{s}	+14° 26′ 46.6″	5.90	−0.22	547	A0V	
26 Boo		26			127739	71115	14^{h} 32^{m} 32.62^{s}	+22° 15′ 35.9″	5.91	2.35	168	F2IV	
					129153	71759	14^{h} 40^{m} 42.36^{s}	+13° 32′ 03.7″	5.93	2.30	173	F0V	
4 G. Boo			4		126200	70384	14^{h} 24^{m} 00.88^{s}	+08° 14′ 38.4″	5.94	0.58	384	A3V	Algol variable
3 Boo		3			120064	67239	13^{h} 46^{m} 43.33^{s}	+25° 42′ 08.6″	5.97	1.36	272	F6IV-V	
CN Boo				CN	124953		14^{h} 16^{m} 04.20^{s}	+18° 54′ 43.0″	5.98			A8III	δ Sct variable, ΔV = 0.03^{m}, P = 0.04 d
1 G. Boo			1		122365	68498	14^{h} 01^{m} 20.41^{s}	+08° 53′ 41.7″	5.98	1.25	288	A2V	
					135438	74561	15^{h} 14^{m} 06.01^{s}	+31° 47′ 16.5″	5.98	−0.29	585	K5	
					127726	71094	14^{h} 32^{m} 20.27^{s}	+26° 40′ 38.4″	6.00	1.74	232	A7Vn	
DE Boo				DE	131511	72848	14^{h} 53^{m} 24.04^{s}	+19° 09′ 08.2″	6.00	5.69	38	K2V	RS CVn variable, V_{max} = 5.97^{m}, V_{min} = 6.04^{m}, P = 10.39 d
					121980	68279	13^{h} 58^{m} 39.95^{s}	+14° 38′ 57.9″	6.01	−0.05	531	K5III	
					128198	71277	14^{h} 34^{m} 38.52^{s}	+36° 37′ 34.2″	6.02	−0.19	568	K5III	
					134064	74000	15^{h} 07^{m} 20.34^{s}	+18° 26′ 31.0″	6.03	1.66	244	A3V	
					127304	70892	14^{h} 29^{m} 49.68^{s}	+31° 47′ 28.2″	6.06	0.91	349	A0Vs	
					137390	75369	15^{h} 24^{m} 05.13^{s}	+45° 16′ 15.7″	6.07	0.22	482	K2III	
					120934	67714	13^{h} 52^{m} 18.39^{s}	+12° 09′ 54.6″	6.10	1.11	325	A1V	
					119584	66992	13^{h} 43^{m} 45.13^{s}	+22° 42′ 01.8″	6.12	−0.63	731	K4III	
					132029	73068	14^{h} 55^{m} 58.63^{s}	+32° 18′ 00.3″	6.12	1.21	313	A2V	
					135530	74571	15^{h} 14^{m} 10.29^{s}	+42° 10′ 17.2″	6.12	−1.32	1003	M2III	
					129132	71729	14^{h} 40^{m} 21.88^{s}	+21° 58′ 32.8″	6.13	1.01	344	G0V	
					124186	69316	14^{h} 11^{m} 15.14^{s}	+32° 17′ 44.9″	6.14	0.79	383	K4III	
					136751	75093	15^{h} 20^{m} 41.65^{s}	+44° 26′ 04.7″	6.14	2.49	175	F4IVs	
					130025	72139	14^{h} 45^{m} 20.58^{s}	+18° 53′ 05.7″	6.15	0.24	495	K0	
					130603	72412	14^{h} 48^{m} 23.41^{s}	+24° 22′ 00.3″	6.15	1.61	264	F2V	
					130817	72469	14^{h} 49^{m} 06.93^{s}	+37° 48′ 39.3″	6.15	3.09	134	F2V	
					138213	75770	15^{h} 28^{m} 44.41^{s}	+47° 12′ 05.4″	6.15	0.32	479	Amvar...	
					119288	66860	13^{h} 42^{m} 12.98^{s}	+08° 23′ 19.0″	6.16	3.39	117	F3Vp	174 G. Vir in Boötes
					121560	68030	13^{h} 55^{m} 50.17^{s}	+14° 03′ 23.3″	6.16	4.24	79	F6V	
					134323	74121	15^{h} 08^{m} 53.54^{s}	+13° 14′ 06.2″	6.16	−0.10	582	G6V:	
HD 122563					122563	68594	14^{h} 02^{m} 31.96^{s}	+09° 41′ 10.6″	6.18	−0.94	867	F8IV	extremely metal-poor giant
					125349	69818	14^{h} 17^{m} 21.16^{s}	+51° 18′ 26.6″	6.19	1.15	331	A2IV	
5 G. Boo			5		126271	70414	14^{h} 24^{m} 18.34^{s}	+08° 05′ 05.4″	6.19	0.95	363	K4III	
					135402	74514	15^{h} 13^{m} 35.59^{s}	+38° 15′ 53.3″	6.19	0.54	439	K2III:	
					126141	70310	14^{h} 23^{m} 06.92^{s}	+25° 20′ 16.9″	6.22	3.46	116	F5V	
					127065	70762	14^{h} 28^{m} 16.46^{s}	+36° 11′ 49.3″	6.22	−1.07	937	K0III	
11 Boo		11			122405	68478	14^{h} 01^{m} 10.53^{s}	+27° 23′ 11.6″	6.23	1.14	340	A7III	
					124755	69569	14^{h} 14^{m} 23.57^{s}	+41° 31′ 08.5″	6.23	2.98	146	K3III:	
2 G. Boo			2		122744	68687	14^{h} 03^{m} 36.79^{s}	+07° 32′ 46.4″	6.25	0.64	432	G9III	
					125040	69751	14^{h} 16^{m} 32.93^{s}	+20° 07′ 19.5″	6.25	3.71	105	F8V	
					122742	68682	14^{h} 03^{m} 32.30^{s}	+10° 47′ 15.1″	6.27	5.17	54	G8V	
					130084	72124	14^{h} 45^{m} 13.68^{s}	+32° 47′ 18.6″	6.27	−1.11	976	M1III	
					126597	70517	14^{h} 25^{m} 29.15^{s}	+38° 23′ 35.2″	6.28	−0.13	625	K2III:	
					132879	73464	15^{h} 00^{m} 52.28^{s}	+22° 02′ 44.1″	6.29	−1.19	1022	K0	
					125406	69862	14^{h} 17^{m} 49.21^{s}	+48° 00′ 07.5″	6.32	2.07	231	F5	
					128093	71243	14^{h} 34^{m} 11.63^{s}	+32° 32′ 04.1″	6.32	3.20	137	F5V	
					125642	70029	14^{h} 19^{m} 47.72^{s}	+38° 47′ 38.7″	6.33	0.65	447	A2V	
					134493	74083	15^{h} 08^{m} 19.54^{s}	+50° 03′ 18.0″	6.33	0.77	423	K0III	
BX Boo				BX	133029	73454	15^{h} 00^{m} 38.73^{s}	+47° 16′ 38.7″	6.35	0.53	477	B9p SiSrCr	α^{2} CVn variable, V_{max} = 6.33^{m}, V_{min} = 6.41^{m}, P = 2.88813 d
					134044	73941	15^{h} 06^{m} 35.19^{s}	+36° 27′ 21.5″	6.35	4.00	96	F8V	
					122443	68516	14^{h} 01^{m} 36.84^{s}	+17° 40′ 06.9″	6.36	−4.98	6037	G5	
					127334	70873	14^{h} 29^{m} 36.68^{s}	+41° 47′ 47.2″	6.36	4.50	77	G5V	
					124713	69592	14^{h} 14^{m} 40.94^{s}	+21° 52′ 24.3″	6.38	2.53	192	A7V	
					125111	69735	14^{h} 16^{m} 24.38^{s}	+39° 44′ 40.9″	6.38	2.96	157	F2IV	
					126307	70385	14^{h} 24^{m} 01.98^{s}	+27° 24′ 47.5″	6.39	−1.89	1475	K4III	
					127986	71168	14^{h} 33^{m} 20.27^{s}	+36° 57′ 33.1″	6.39	2.07	238	F8IVw	
					128402	71406	14^{h} 36^{m} 06.88^{s}	+23° 15′ 01.1″	6.39	1.08	377	K0	
					129430	71857	14^{h} 41^{m} 54.24^{s}	+21° 07′ 25.3″	6.40	0.58	475	G8III	
					131473	72846	14^{h} 53^{m} 23.36^{s}	+15° 42′ 18.4″	6.41	2.96	160	F6III	
					119784	67104	13^{h} 45^{m} 13.47^{s}	+10° 19′ 31.5″	6.42	1.14	371	K2	
RX Boo				RX	126327	70401	14^{h} 24^{m} 11.63^{s}	+25° 42′ 13.4″	6.43		500	M7.5e	semiregular variable, V_{max} = 6.43^{m}, V_{min} = 9.1^{m}
					124678	69585	14^{h} 14^{m} 35.66^{s}	+13° 58′ 30.9″	6.45	0.51	502	K2	
					125658	70051	14^{h} 20^{m} 08.67^{s}	+30° 25′ 44.9″	6.45	1.76	283	A5III	
					118839	66594	13^{h} 39^{m} 02.31^{s}	+18° 15′ 55.3″	6.46	−0.31	738	K3III	
					125632	69958	14^{h} 18^{m} 55.93^{s}	+54° 51′ 49.6″	6.47	1.42	334	A5Vn	
					135944	74690	15^{h} 15^{m} 50.68^{s}	+50° 56′ 18.8″	6.47	2.56	197	G5	
					118660	66522	13^{h} 38^{m} 07.86^{s}	+14° 18′ 07.1″	6.49	2.21	234	A9Vs	
					131040	72508	14^{h} 49^{m} 32.37^{s}	+51° 22′ 28.2″	6.49	2.93	168	F5IV	
					125076	69704	14^{h} 16^{m} 02.41^{s}	+45° 33′ 58.0″	6.50	1.00	410	K0	
CI Boo				CI	126009	70236	14^{h} 22^{m} 14.03^{s}	+29° 22′ 11.9″	6.50	−0.19	709	MIII	irregular variable, V_{max} = 6.23^{m}, V_{min} = 6.57^{m}
					132145	73156	14^{h} 57^{m} 03.61^{s}	+21° 33′ 19.7″	6.50	0.83	444	A1V	
μ^{2} Boo	μ^{2}	51			137392	75415	15^{h} 24^{m} 30.97^{s}	+37° 20′ 49.5″	6.51	3.65	122	G1V	component of the μ Boo system
κ^{1} Boo	κ^{1}	17			124674	69481	14^{h} 13^{m} 27.75^{s}	+51° 47′ 16.4″	6.62	2.73	196	F1V	component of the κ Boo system
HD 141399					141399	77301	15^{h} 46^{m} 54.0^{s}	+46° 59′ 11″	7.2	4.41	118	K0V	has four planets (b, c, d & e)
HD 128311					128311	71395	14^{h} 36^{m} 00.56^{s}	+09° 44′ 47.5″	7.48	6.38	54	K0V	has two planets (b & c)
HD 136418					136418	74961	15^{h} 19^{m} 06.18^{s}	+41° 43′ 59.5″	7.88	2.74	347	G5III	Nikawiy; has a planet (b)
HD 131496					131496	72845	14^{h} 53^{m} 23^{s}	+18° 14′ 07″	7.96	2.75	359	K0	Arcalís, has a planet (b)
HD 132406					132406	73146	14^{h} 56^{m} 54.65^{s}	+53° 22′ 55.8″	8.45	4.19	231	G0V	has a planet (b)
HD 132563 B					132563		14^{h} 58^{m} 21^{s}	+44° 02′ 36″	9.47	4.56	313		has a planet (HD 132563 B b)
WASP-14							14^{h} 33^{m} 06.3549^{s}	+21° 53′ 40.978″	9.745	3.725	521.6	F5V	has a transiting planet WASP-14b
BD+36°2593							15^{h} 19^{m} 57.93^{s}	+36° 13′ 46.8″	11.2	3.6	1010	F	has a transiting planet HAT-P-4b
R Boo				R	128609	71490	14^{h} 37^{m} 11.70^{s}	+26° 44′ 10.0″	11.70	3.16	1664	M4e	Mira variable, V_{max} = 6.0^{m}, V_{min} = 13.3^{m}, P = 223.11 d
CR Boo				CR			13^{h} 48^{m} 55.22^{s}	+07° 57′ 35.7″	15.00		1150		AM CVn variable
LHS 2924							14^{h} 28^{m} 43.2272^{s}	+33° 10′ 39.2458″	19.35	19.15	35.84	M9V	one of the dimmest and least massive stars known
Table legend: Name = Proper name; B = Bayer designation; F or/and G. = Flamsteed designation or Gould designation; Var = Variable-star designation; HD = Henry Draper Catalogue designation number; HIP = Hipparcos Catalogue designation number; RA = Right ascension for the Epoch/Equinox J2000.0; Dec = Declination for the Epoch/Equinox J2000.0; vis. mag. = visual magnitude (m or m_{v}), also known as apparent magnitude; abs. mag. = absolute magnitude (M_{v}); Dist. (ly) = Distance in light-years from Earth; Sp. class = Spectral class of the star in the stellar classification system; Notes = Common name(s) or alternate name(s); comments; notable properties [for example: multiple star status, range of variability if it is a variable star, exoplanets, etc.]

== See also ==
- List of stars by constellation
