= HD 190655 =

Eclipsing binary in the constellation Cygnus

- Location of HD 190655 (circled)

Observation data Epoch J2000.0 Equinox ICRS
- Constellation: Cygnus
- Right ascension: 20^{h} 04^{m} 11.34545^{s}
- Declination: +45° 05′ 15.3640″
- Apparent magnitude (V): 10.114 (combined)

Characteristics
- Evolutionary stage: Red giant branch
- Spectral type: K2III + (G4IV + M8-L3)
- B−V color index: 1.153
- J−H color index: 0.521
- J−K color index: 0.684
- Variable type: Eclipsing binary

Astrometry
Radial velocity (R_{v})	−24.1724±0.002728 km/s
Proper motion (μ)	RA: -8.419 mas/yr Dec.: −3.176 mas/yr
Parallax (π)	2.1394±0.3070 mas
Distance	approx. 1,500 ly (approx. 470 pc)

Orbit
Primary	HD 190655 A
Name	HD 190655 B
Semi-major axis (a)	0.4" (270 AU)

Orbit
Primary	HD 190655 B
Name	HD 190655 C
Period (P)	5.566513±0.000043 d
Semi-major axis (a)	0.0720±0.0013 AU
Inclination (i)	82.50+0.58 −0.53°

Details

HD 190655 A
Mass	1.69+0.14 −0.10 M_{☉}
Radius	11.13+0.32 −0.26 R_{☉}
Luminosity	43.3±9.5 L_{☉}
Surface gravity (log g)	2.577+0.011 −0.009 cgs
Temperature	4720±120 K
Metallicity [Fe/H]	0.143±0.065 dex
Age	2.05+0.56 −0.28 Gyr

HD 190655 B
Mass	1.608+0.087 −0.088 M_{☉}
Radius	3.61+0.11 −0.12 R_{☉}
Luminosity	11.5±1.0 L_{☉}
Temperature	5600±100 K

HD 190655 C
Mass	66.1+4.1 −3.2 M_{Jup}
Radius	1.524+0.070 −0.072 R_{Jup}

Other designations
- BD+44°3330, HD 190655, WDS J20042+4505AB, KOI-3886, KIC 8848288, TIC 185060864, TYC 3559-2080-1, GSC 03559-02080, 2MASS J20041135+4505154, WISE J200411.34+450515.3, Gaia DR3 2082133182277361152

Database references
SIMBAD	data

HD 190655 (KOI-3886) is a hierarchical triple star system located about 1,500 light-years (460 parsecs) away in the northern constellation of Cygnus. It has a combined apparent magnitude of 10.114, making it readily visible using a small telescope with an aperture of 35 mm or larger, but too faint to observe via the naked eye or binoculars.

The system consists of a K-type red giant (HD 190655 A) and a G-type subgiant in a wide binary, with a transiting brown dwarf orbiting the latter. The brown dwarf component is notable in that it is one of the most irradiated objects of its kind, and also the first to be discovered transiting an evolved star. Since it showed planet-like characteristics in a variety of past observations, the brown dwarf has been dubbed the "ultimate planet impostor."

== Stellar components ==
The two stellar components of the system have both evolved past the main sequence, with similar masses of 1.6–1.7 M_{☉}. Because of their similar proper motions and an exceedingly low (0.04%) probability of two unrelated evolved stars being situated at such a small separation, the two stars are almost certainly gravitationally bound, i.e., are in a physical binary system.

The primary star, HD 190655 A, is in the process of ascending the red-giant branch, having expanded to 11 times the girth of the Sun. At an effective temperature of 4,720 K (4,450 °C; 8,040 °F), it radiates close to 45 times the luminosity of the Sun from its photosphere. It is aged about two billion years, less than half the age of the Solar System, but has evolved beyond the main sequence unlike the Sun due to its higher mass. Much like most red giants, the star exhibits solar-like oscillations, strongest at a frequency of about 50 μHz.

The secondary star, situated 270 AU away from the primary, is slightly lighter and less evolved, still at the subgiant stage. It is smaller and hotter than the brighter red giant, with a temperature of 5,600 K (5,330 °C; 9,620 °F), similar to that of the Sun (5,772 K). With a diameter of 3.61 R_{☉}, it shines at a luminosity of 11.5 L_{☉}, about a quarter of the primary star.

In 2013, the pulsating primary star was examined for the possibility of being part of an eclipsing binary, but was deemed a false positive. The system, however, later did turn out to be an eclipsing binary, but one between a subgiant (B) and a brown dwarf (C) rather than between the red giant and a stellar companion.

== Brown dwarf ==
HD 190655 C was first named as a planetary candidate (KOI-3886.01) in 2012 as part of a collection of 150 promising transit signals. Early estimates gauged its radius at a colossal 21.70 R_{🜨} (1.936 R_{J}), which would have placed it among the largest exoplanets ever discovered. This was made even more intriguing by the fact that the object was projected to orbit a red giant (A) close to exceeding the Roche lobe, meaning it would have been a rare example of an enormous hot Jupiter in the last few million years of its life before falling into its host star.

In 2021, however, meticulous observations revealed that the object instead orbited a subgiant companion star (B) rather than the red giant primary, and that it was causing radial velocity variations of ~7 km/s, far larger than initially thought, implying a mass much higher than the previous estimate of 1.81±0.11 M_{J}. Indeed, the mass of HD 190655 C is now thought to be at around 66 M_{J}, firmly placing it within the brown dwarf mass range.

Due to its vicinity to the subgiant host, HD 190655 C receives 2,100 times as much radiative flux as Earth does. As a result, its atmosphere is puffed up to reach a radius of over 1.5 R_{J}, making it the most inflated known brown dwarf in 2021.

== See also ==
- Iota Draconis: a red giant similar to HD 190655 A, with two confirmed planets.
- WD 0032−317 b: another highly irradiated brown dwarf.
- 24 Boötis b, Kepler-91b: planets close to their red giant hosts.
