= CL Draconis =

Star in the constellation Draco

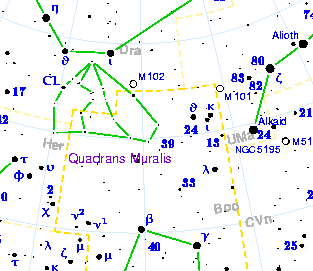
- CL Draconis (circled), with the obsolete constellation Quadrans Muralis in the background.

Observation data Epoch J2000 Equinox ICRS
- Constellation: Draco
- Right ascension: 15^{h} 57^{m} 47.44066^{s}
- Declination: +54° 44′ 59.1496″
- Apparent magnitude (V): 4.96

Characteristics
- Evolutionary stage: main sequence
- Spectral type: F0 IV
- B−V color index: 0.269±0.008
- Variable type: δ Sct

Astrometry
Radial velocity (R_{v})	−11.0±4.2 km/s
Proper motion (μ)	RA: −151.009 mas/yr Dec.: +107.081 mas/yr
Parallax (π)	29.6204±0.0809 mas
Distance	110.1 ± 0.3 ly (33.76 ± 0.09 pc)
Absolute magnitude (M_{V})	2.33

Details
Mass	1.68±0.01 M_{☉}
Luminosity	10.2+0.2 −0.3 L_{☉}
Surface gravity (log g)	4.04±0.14 cgs
Temperature	7,439±253 K
Metallicity [Fe/H]	0.04±0.10 dex
Rotational velocity (v sin i)	165 km/s
Age	643 Myr

Other designations
- CL Dra, AG+54°1023, BD+55°1793, FK5 595, HD 143466, HIP 78180, HR 5960, SAO 29727

Database references
SIMBAD	data

CL Draconis is a single star in the northern circumpolar constellation of Draco. It can be viewed with the naked eye, having an apparent visual magnitude of 4.96. The distance to this star, as determined from its annual parallax shift of 29.6 mas, is 110 light years. It is moving closer to the Earth with a heliocentric radial velocity of −11 km/s. The star has a relatively high proper motion, traversing the celestial sphere at the rate of 0.185″/yr.

Based upon a stellar classification of F0 IV, this is an aging F-type subgiant star that has consumed the hydrogen at its core. It is spinning rapidly with a projected rotational velocity of 165 km/s, giving it an oblate shape with an equatorial bulge that is estimated to be 8% larger than the polar radius.

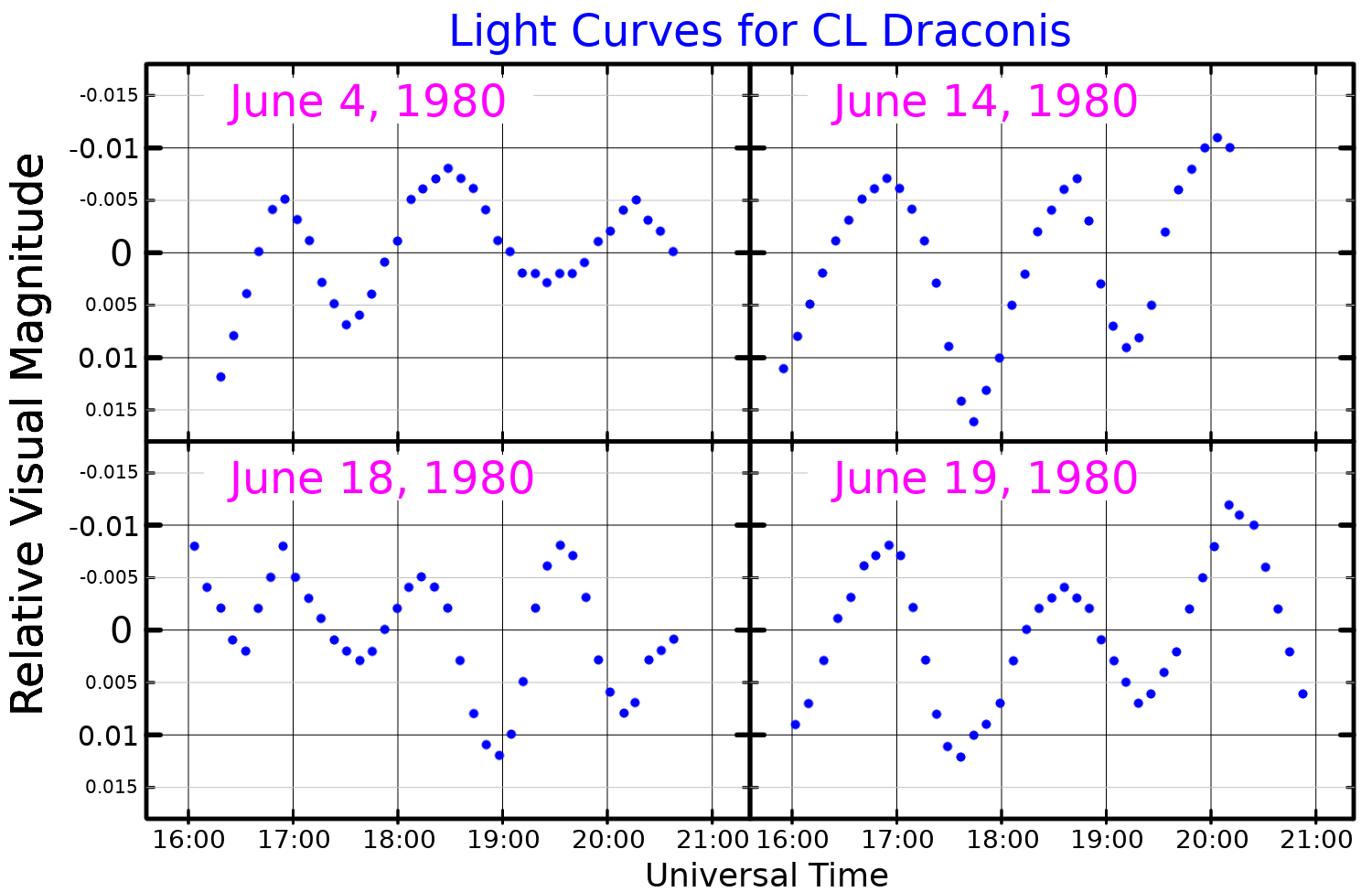
caption=Visual band light curves for CL Draconis, adapted from DuPuy and Burgoyne (1983)

CL Draconis is a Delta Scuti variable, changing brightness with an amplitude of 0.010 magnitude over a period of 1.83 hours. CL Dra has 1.68 times the mass of the Sun and is radiating 10.2 times the Sun's luminosity from its photosphere at an effective temperature of 7,439 K.

It was transferred from Draco to Quadrans Muralis. Later when the International Astronomical Union officially recognised constellations, Quadrans Muralis became obsolete, so this star was moved back to Draco.
