= Quadrans Muralis =

Former constellation

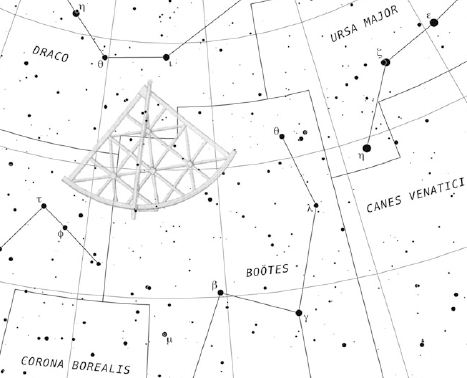
Map of the obsolete constellation Quadrans Muralis in relation to the modern constellations

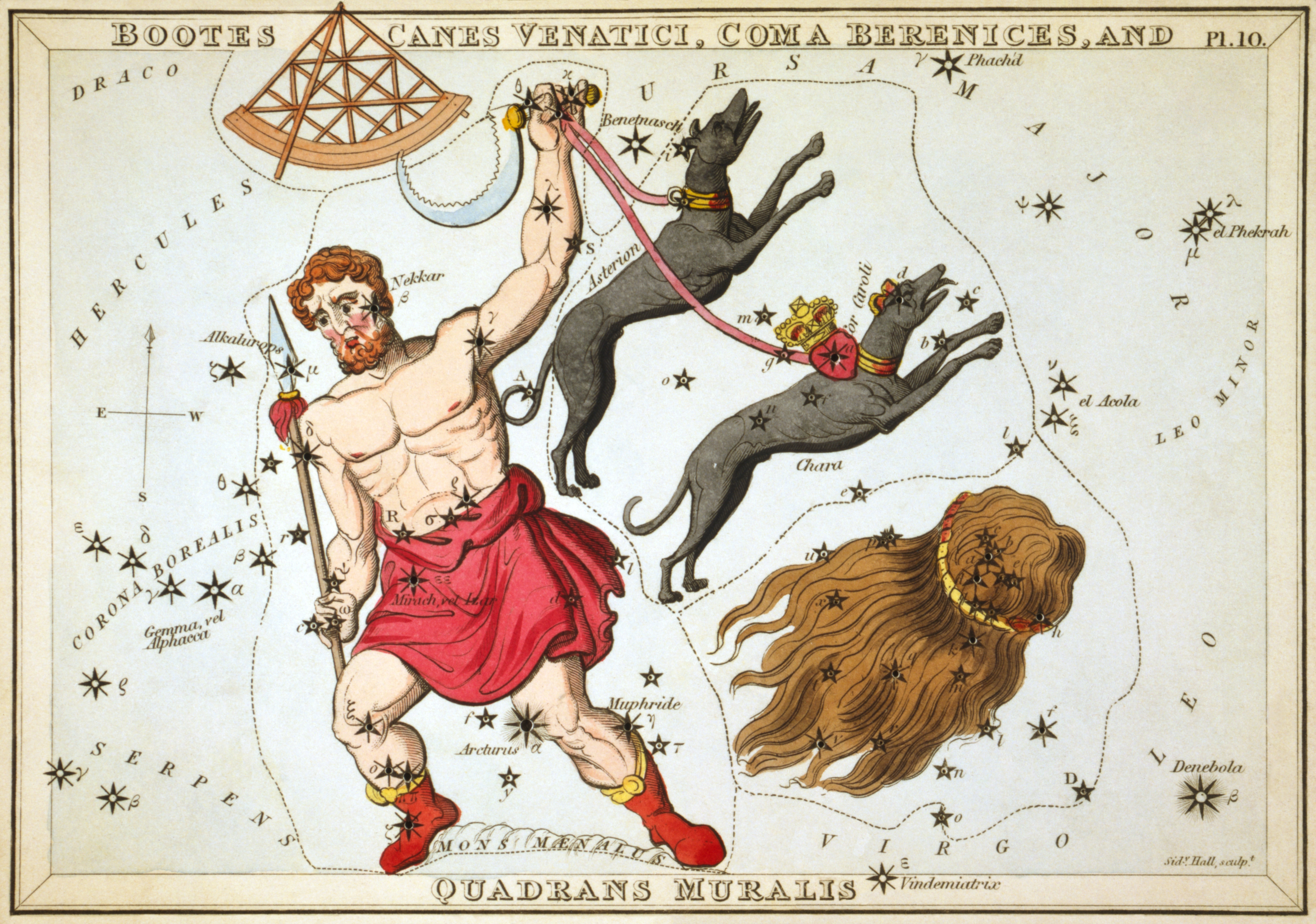
Quadrans Muralis can be seen at the top left of this 1825 star chart from Urania's Mirror.

Quadrans Muralis (Latin for mural quadrant) was a constellation created by the French astronomer Jérôme Lalande in 1795. It depicted a wall-mounted quadrant with which he and his nephew Michel Lefrançois de Lalande had charted the celestial sphere, and was named Le Mural in the French atlas. It was between the constellations of Boötes and Draco, near the tail of Ursa Major, containing stars between β Bootis (Nekkar) and η Ursae Majoris (Alkaid).

Johann Elert Bode converted its name to Latin as Quadrans Muralis and shrank the constellation a little in his 1801 Uranographia star atlas, to avoid it clashing with neighboring constellations.

In 1922, Quadrans Muralis was omitted when the International Astronomical Union (IAU) formalized its list of officially recognized constellations.

== Notable features ==
- 44 Boötis was the brightest star of Lalande's version of the constellation. the primary component of the system 44 Boötis A was named Quadrans by the IAU Working Group on Star Names in 2025.
- CL Draconis was the brightest star of Bode's version of the constellation.
- The variable star BP Boötis was a member of the constellation.
- 39 Boötis is a double star that was transferred by Lalande into Quadrans.
- The Quadrantid meteor shower is still named after the obsolete constellation.

== See also ==
- Former constellations
