= 39 Boötis =

Star in the constellation Boötes

Observation data Epoch J2000 Equinox ICRS
- Constellation: Boötes
- Right ascension: 14^{h} 49^{m} 41.29265^{s}
- Declination: +48° 43′ 14.9077″
- Apparent magnitude (V): 5.68 (6.36 + 6.72)

Characteristics
- Spectral type: F8V + F7V

Astrometry
Radial velocity (R_{v})	−30.9±0.3 km/s
Proper motion (μ)	RA: −77.94 mas/yr Dec.: 100.83 mas/yr
Parallax (π)	14.58±0.51 mas
Distance	224 ± 8 ly (69 ± 2 pc)
Absolute magnitude (M_{V})	2.53

Orbit
Period (P)	12.822 d
Eccentricity (e)	0.39
Periastron epoch (T)	2,422,379.49 JD
Argument of periastron (ω) (secondary)	97.1°
Semi-amplitude (K_{1}) (primary)	58.3 km/s
Semi-amplitude (K_{2}) (secondary)	72.2 km/s

Details

39 Boo A
Mass	1.29/1.05 M_{☉}
Metallicity [Fe/H]	0.06 dex
Rotational velocity (v sin i)	161.0 km/s
Age	1.30 Gyr

39 Boo B
Mass	1.25 M_{☉}

Other designations
- 39 Boo, AG+48°1158, BD+49°2326, HD 131041, HIP 72524, HR 5538, SAO 45231, CCDM J14497+4843, WDS J14497+4843

Database references
SIMBAD	data

39 Boötis is a triple star system located around 224 light years away from the Sun in the northern constellation of Boötes. It is visible to the naked eye as a faint, yellow-white hued star with a combined apparent magnitude of 5.68. The system is moving closer to the Earth with a heliocentric radial velocity of −31 km/s.

The magnitude 6.36 primary, component A, is actually a double-lined spectroscopic binary system with an orbital period of 12.822 days, an eccentricity of 0.39, and an angular separation of 2.021 mas. It has a combined stellar classification of F8V, matching an F-type main-sequence star, with individual massed of 1.29 and 1.05 times the mass of the Sun. Component B is of magnitude 6.72 with a class of F7V and 1.25 solar masses. The A–B pair have a separation of 2.9″ and a period of 1,347.653 years. This system is a source of X-ray emission with a luminosity of 41.4×10^{28} erg s^{−1}.

It was a transferred by Jérôme Lalande from Boötes to Quadrans Muralis. Later when the International Astronomical Union officially recognised constellations, Quadrans Muralis became obsolete, so this star was moved back to Boötes.
