= RX Boötis =

Star in the constellation Boötes

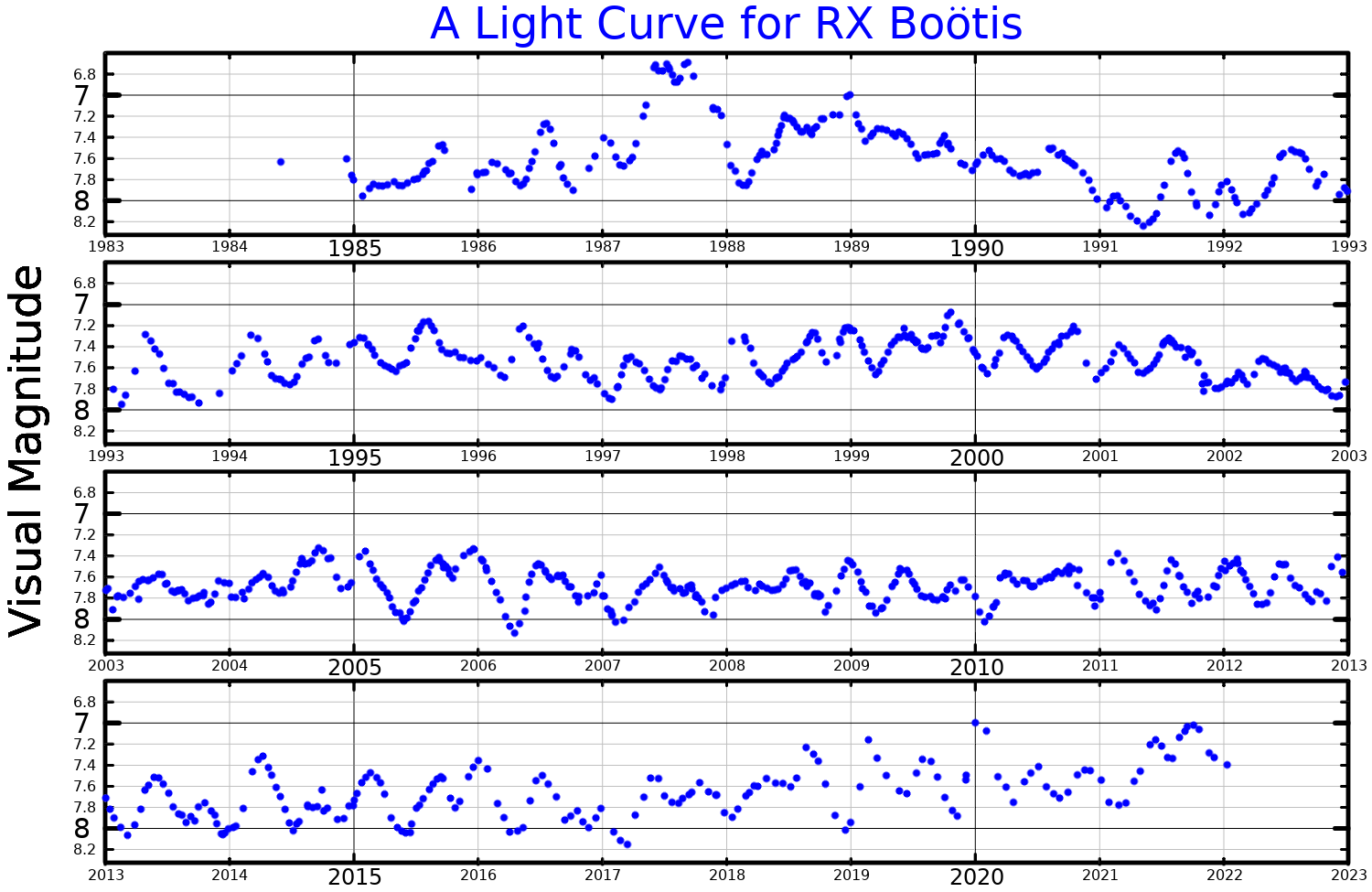
- A visual band light curve for RX Boötis, plotted from data published by Cadmus (2024)

Observation data Epoch J2000 Equinox J2000
- Constellation: Boötes
- Right ascension: 14^{h} 24^{m} 11.62532^{s}
- Declination: 25° 42′ 13.3942″
- Apparent magnitude (V): 6.43 - 9.1

Characteristics
- Evolutionary stage: AGB
- Spectral type: M7.5e
- Variable type: Semiregular (SRB)

Astrometry
Radial velocity (R_{v})	3.8±1 km/s
Proper motion (μ)	RA: +24.55 mas/yr Dec.: −49.67 mas/yr
Parallax (π)	7.31±0.50 mas
Distance	440+33 −29 ly (136+10 −9 pc)

Details
Mass	2.2 M_{☉}
Radius	270 R_{☉}
Luminosity	3630 L_{☉}
Surface gravity (log g)	1.94 cgs
Temperature	2750 K
Metallicity [Fe/H]	−0.32 dex

Other designations
- RX Boo, BD+26°2563, HD 126327, HIP 70401, SAO 83331

Database references
SIMBAD	data

RX Boötis is a variable star in the northern constellation of Boötes. Varying in brightness from magnitude 6.43 to 9.1, it is too faint to be seen with the naked eye, but can be seen with binoculars. Based on parallax measurements, it is 440 light-years away.

During the period from 1880 through 1892, Ernst Hartwig observed the star (then known as BD +26°2563) and discovered that its brightness varies. This discovery was announced in 1893, and in 1911 it was given its variable star designation, RX Boötis. Many periods have been reported for this star's brightness changes, including 78, 158, 160, 179, 278 and 340 days. Some studies have found pairs of periods, indicating that the star is a double-mode oscillator.

RX Boötis is an oxygen-rich AGB star, and it is losing mass via a stellar wind, producing a circumstellar envelope (CSE). Near-infrared radiation from dust in this CSE was detected during the Two-Micron Sky Survey, published in 1969. The 60 micron data from the IRAS satellite showed a dust shell 6.6 arc minutes (~0.8 lightyear) in radius. In the late 1970s, CO was detected in the CSE, expanding from the star at 7.8±1.5 km/sec. A later study of the CO emission lines produced an estimate for the star's mass loss rate of 3.6×10^{−7} M_{☉} per year. RX Boötis may not yet have begun losing mass at a high rate. Strong, variable, water maser emission at 22 GHz is seen, arising from an incomplete ring of bright spots, each of which lasts for about a year, arranged in an incomplete ring whose inner radius is 15 AU with a thickness of 22 AU. A far-ultraviolet image of the star obtained from GALEX shows a bow shock 325 arc seconds (~0.7 lightyears) from the star, where the wind from RX Boötis collides with the interstellar medium.

VLBI observations of RX Boötis have yielded a distance estimate to RX Boötis of 136±10 parsecs, smaller than Gaia's value of 156±6 parsecs. Optically measured parallaxes for AGB stars, like Gaia's, may have larger than normal errors due to the pulsations and dusty environments of these stars.
