= HD 132406 =

Star in the constellation Boötes

Observation data Epoch J2000 Equinox ICRS
- Constellation: Boötes
- Right ascension: 14^{h} 56^{m} 54.65138^{s}
- Declination: +53° 22′ 55.8065″
- Apparent magnitude (V): 8.45

Characteristics
- Spectral type: G0V
- B−V color index: 0.650±0.015

Astrometry
| Radial velocity (R_{v}) | −37.80±0.13 km/s |
| Proper motion (μ) | RA: −14.122 mas/yr Dec.: −280.330 mas/yr |
| Parallax (π) | 14.1756±0.0191 mas |
| Distance | 230.1 ± 0.3 ly (70.54 ± 0.10 pc) |
| Absolute magnitude (M_{V}) | 4.30 |

Details
| Mass | 1.02+0.03 −0.02 M_{☉} |
| Radius | 1.36+0.03 −0.01 R_{☉} |
| Luminosity | 1.827±0.006 L_{☉} |
| Surface gravity (log g) | 4.22±0.05 cgs |
| Temperature | 5,754+29 −51 K |
| Metallicity [Fe/H] | 0.07±0.04 dex |
| Rotational velocity (v sin i) | 1.7 km/s |
| Age | 8.79+1.13 −1.51 Gyr |

Other designations
- BD+53°1752, HD 132406, HIP 73146, SAO 29349, PPM 34765, LTT 14438, TYC 3861-267-1, 2MASS J14565464+5322557

Database references
| SIMBAD | data |

HD 132406 is a star in the northern constellation of Boötes. With an apparent visual magnitude of 8.45, it is invisible to the naked eye. The distance to this star is 230 light-years (71 parsecs) based on parallax, but it is drifting closer with a radial velocity of −37.8 km/s. The star has an absolute magnitude of 4.30. It has one confirmed exoplanet companion.

The stellar classification of HD 132406 is G0V, matching an ordinary G-type main-sequence star like the Sun. It is an older star with an age of up to nine billion years and is spinning with a leisurely projected rotational velocity of 1.7 km/s. It appears to have a similar mass as the Sun but is about 36% greater in girth. The metallicity, or chemical abundance of heavier elements, appears slightly higher than in the Sun. The star is radiating 1.8 times the luminosity of the Sun from its photosphere at an effective temperature of 5,754 K.

A planetary companion was announced in 2007, based on the radial velocity variation of the host star as measured using the ELODIE spectrograph instrument. This super Jupiter has an orbital period of 2.67 years with an eccentricity of 0.34. An astrometric measurement of the planet's inclination and true mass was published in 2022 as part of Gaia DR3, and this was updated in 2023.

The HD 132406 planetary system
| Companion (in order from star) | Mass | Semimajor axis (AU) | Orbital period (years) | Eccentricity | Inclination (°) | Radius |
|---|---|---|---|---|---|---|
| b | 6.2+2.2 −1.1 M_{J} | 1.969+0.06 −0.064 | 2.64±0.11 | 0.303+0.093 −0.077 | 116+19 −18 | — |
