= HD 126009 =

Star in the constellation Boötes

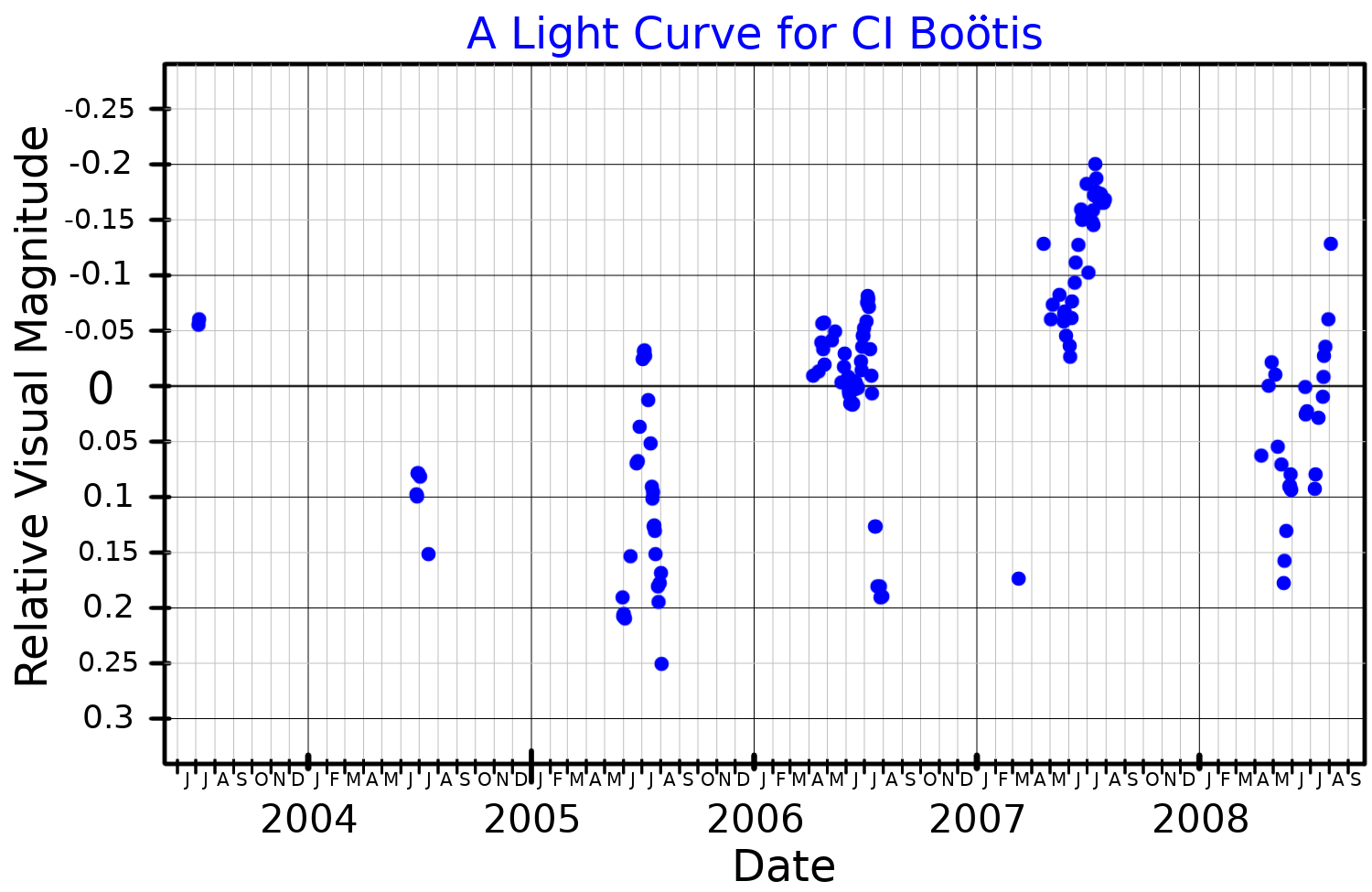
- The visual band light curve of HD 126009, plotted from data presented by Tabur et al. (2009)

Observation data Epoch J2000 Equinox ICRS
- Constellation: Boötes
- Right ascension: 14^{h} 22^{m} 14.00070^{s}
- Declination: +29° 22′ 11.7179″
- Apparent magnitude (V): 6.47 – 6.81

Characteristics
- Spectral type: M3III
- U−B color index: +1.46
- B−V color index: +1.60
- Variable type: Irregular

Astrometry
Radial velocity (R_{v})	−19.66±0.54 km/s
Proper motion (μ)	RA: −39.980 mas/yr Dec.: −26.201 mas/yr
Parallax (π)	4.5229±0.0973 mas
Distance	720 ± 20 ly (221 ± 5 pc)
Absolute magnitude (M_{V})	−0.268

Details
Mass	1.8 M_{☉}
Radius	71 R_{☉}
Luminosity	943 L_{☉}
Temperature	3,227 K
Age	1.6 Gyr

Other designations
- CI Boötes, BD+30°2513, HD126009, HIP 70236, SAO 83312.

Database references
SIMBAD	data

HD 126009 or CI Boötis is a variable star in the northern constellation of Boötes. With an apparent magnitude of about 6.5, it would be difficult to see with the naked eye even under the very best observing conditions, but can easily be seen with binoculars.

The German astronomer Wolfgang Strohmeier announced that HD 126009 is a variable star in 1960. It was given its variable star designation, CI Boötis, in 1978.
