= HD 141399 =

Star in the constellation Boötes

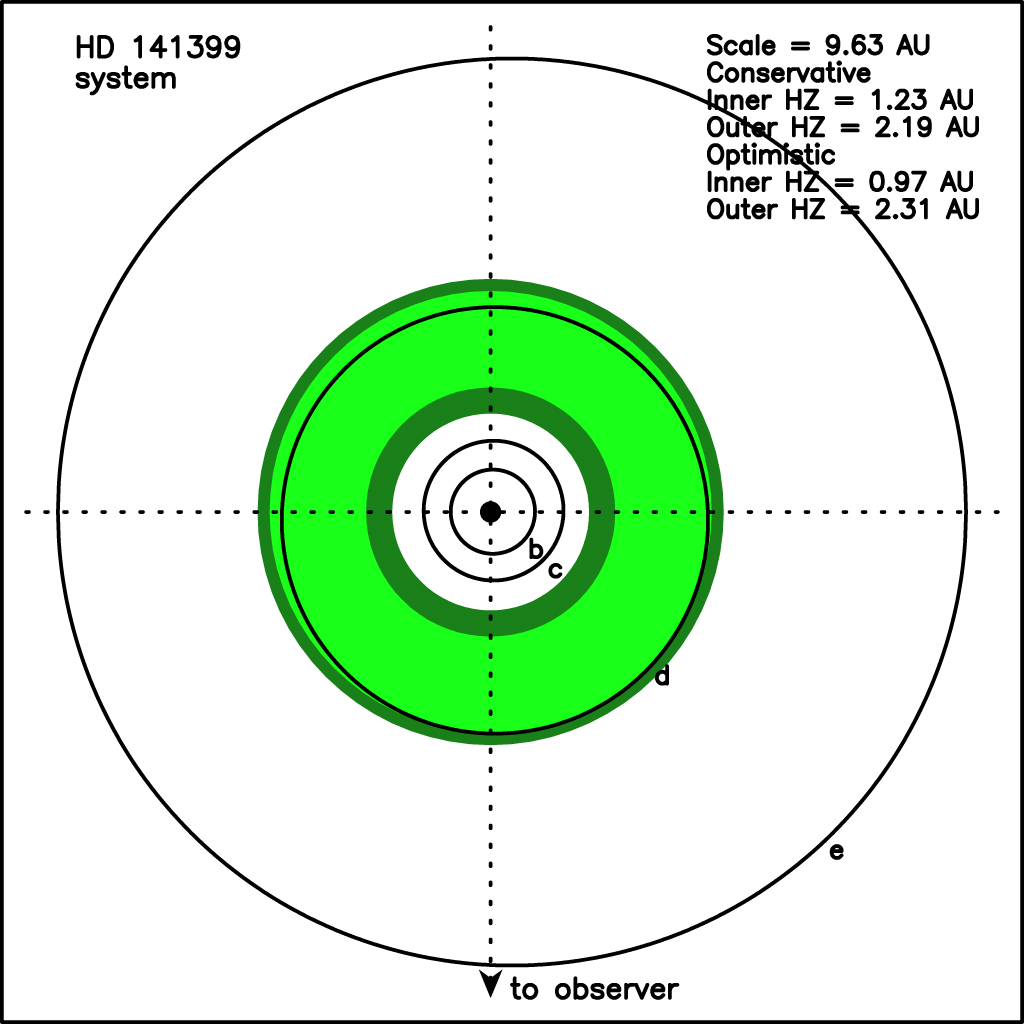
- Habitable zone in the HD 141399 system

Observation data Epoch J2000 Equinox ICRS
- Constellation: Boötes
- Right ascension: 15^{h} 46^{m} 53.8132^{s}
- Declination: +46° 59′ 10.543″
- Apparent magnitude (V): 7.20

Characteristics
- Evolutionary stage: subgiant
- Spectral type: K0
- B−V color index: 0.73±0.04

Astrometry
Radial velocity (R_{v})	−21.9±0.2 km/s
Proper motion (μ)	RA: −108.119 mas/yr Dec.: +6.040 mas/yr
Parallax (π)	26.9888±0.0146 mas
Distance	120.85 ± 0.07 ly (37.05 ± 0.02 pc)
Absolute magnitude (M_{V})	+4.4

Details
Mass	1.09±0.08 M_{☉}
Radius	1.46±0.15 R_{☉}
Luminosity	1.59±0.39 L_{☉}
Habitable zone inner limit	0.974–1.233 AU
Habitable zone outer limit	2.190–2.309 AU
Surface gravity (log g)	4.24±0.05 cgs
Temperature	5,602±34 K
Metallicity [Fe/H]	0.36±0.03 dex
Rotation	49±12
Rotational velocity (v sin i)	2.9±1.0 km/s
Age	7.23 Gyr

Other designations
- BD+47 2267, HIP 77301, TYC 3490-928-1, GSC 03490-00928, 2MASS J15465382+4659105

Database references
SIMBAD	data
Exoplanet Archive	data

HD 141399 is a K-type subgiant star 121 light-years away in the constellation of Boötes. Its surface temperature is 5602 K. HD 141399 is enriched in heavy elements compared to the Sun, with a metallicity Fe/H index of 0.36±0.03. The star has very low starspot activity.

== Planetary system ==
In 2014, four planets orbiting HD 141399 were discovered by the radial velocity method. Planet HD 141399c is possibly located within the habitable zone. The planetary orbits are close to high-order mean-motion resonance and closely conform to the Titius–Bode law. Two additional planets, one with a period of 462.9 days, are suspected by analogy with the orbits of the Solar System planets. The planetary orbits around HD 141399 are expected to "jump" periodically on a timescale of a few million years between several quasi-stable configurations due to planet-planet interactions. HD 141399 is one of only two known planetary systems consisting of at least four massive gas giants (the other is the system of planets around the young star HR 8799).

The HD 141399 planetary system
Companion (in order from star)	Mass	Semimajor axis (AU)	Orbital period (days)	Eccentricity	Inclination (°)	Radius
b	0.451±0.030 M_{J}	0.415±0.011	94.44±0.05	0.04±0.02	—	—
c	1.33±0.08 M_{J}	0.689±0.02	201.99±0.08	0.048±0.009	—	—
d	1.18±0.08 M_{J}	2.09±0.06	1069.8±6.7	0.074±0.025	—	—
e	0.66±0.10 M_{J}	5.0±1.5	3370±90	<0.1	—	—
