= 47 Boötis =

Binary star system in the constellation Boötes

Observation data Epoch J2000 Equinox ICRS
- Constellation: Boötes
- Right ascension: 15^{h} 05^{m} 25.83464^{s}
- Declination: +48° 09′ 03.4943″
- Apparent magnitude (V): 5.581

Characteristics
- Evolutionary stage: main sequence
- Spectral type: A0 Vs
- B−V color index: −0.005±0.003
- Variable type: suspected

Astrometry
Radial velocity (R_{v})	−12.63±0.73 km/s
Proper motion (μ)	RA: −65.912 mas/yr Dec.: +28.641 mas/yr
Parallax (π)	12.4980±0.0766 mas
Distance	261 ± 2 ly (80.0 ± 0.5 pc)
Absolute magnitude (M_{V})	0.97

Details

47 Boo A
Mass	2.46±0.02 M_{☉}
Radius	1.8 R_{☉}
Luminosity	45.7+2.2 −2.0 L_{☉}
Surface gravity (log g)	4.32 cgs
Temperature	10,130 K
Rotational velocity (v sin i)	54.8±1.6 km/s

Other designations
- k Boo, 47 Boo, NSV 6934, BD+48°2262, FK5 1395, GC 20308, HD 133962, HIP 73841, HR 5627, SAO 45370, ADS 9500, CCDM 15054+4809

Database references
SIMBAD	data

47 Boötis is a binary star system in the northern constellation of Boötes, located 261 light years away from the Sun. It has the Bayer designation k Boötis; 47 Boötis is the Flamsteed designation. The system is visible to the naked eye as a faint, white-hued star with a combined apparent visual magnitude of 5.58. It is moving closer to the Earth with a heliocentric radial velocity of −13 km/s.

The primary member of the system, designated component A, is an A-type main-sequence star with a stellar classification of A0 Vs. The 's' indicates sharp lines as it has a moderate rotation rate with a projected rotational velocity of 55 km/s. It is a suspected variable star of unknown type. The star has 2.46 times the mass of the Sun and is radiating 46 times the Sun's luminosity from its photosphere at an effective temperature of 10,130 K.

The companion, component B, is a magnitude 13.3 star located at an angular separation of 6.2 arcseconds away from the primary.
