= HD 126200 =

Star in the constellation Boötes

Observation data Epoch J2000 Equinox ICRS
- Constellation: Boötes
- Right ascension: 14^{h} 24^{m} 00.87809^{s}
- Declination: +08° 14′ 38.2833″
- Apparent magnitude (V): 5.80

Characteristics
- Evolutionary stage: main sequence
- Spectral type: A3V
- U−B color index: +0.12
- B−V color index: +0.03
- Variable type: Algol variable

Astrometry
Radial velocity (R_{v})	−7.0±4.3 km/s
Proper motion (μ)	RA: −6.395 mas/yr Dec.: −13.497 mas/yr
Parallax (π)	7.9699±0.1280 mas
Distance	409 ± 7 ly (125 ± 2 pc)
Absolute magnitude (M_{V})	+0.29

Details
Mass	2.5 M_{☉}
Radius	3.4 R_{☉}
Luminosity	65 L_{☉}
Surface gravity (log g)	3.72 cgs
Temperature	9,071 K
Metallicity [Fe/H]	−0.54 dex
Rotational velocity (v sin i)	144 km/s
Age	476 Myr

Other designations
- BD+08°2857, HD 126200, HIP 70384, HR 5388, SAO 120433

Database references
SIMBAD	data

HD 126200 is a main sequence star in the northern constellation of Boötes. It has been identified as an Algol-type eclipsing binary, although subsequent observations do not confirm this.
