= HD 126129 and HD 126128 =

Triple star system in the constellation of Boötes

Observation data Epoch J2000 Equinox ICRS
- Constellation: Boötes
- HD 126129
- Right ascension: 14^{h} 23^{m} 22.69548^{s}
- Declination: +08° 26′ 47.8266″
- Apparent magnitude (V): 5.04
- HD 126128
- Right ascension: 14^{h} 23^{m} 22.59914^{s}
- Declination: +08° 26′ 41.6666″
- Apparent magnitude (V): 6.74 (7.50 + 7.70)‍

Characteristics

HD 126129
- Evolutionary stage: main sequence
- Spectral type: A0V
- U−B color index: −0.08
- B−V color index: −0.02

HD 126128
- Spectral type: F0V + F2V
- U−B color index: −0.01
- B−V color index: +0.43

Astrometry

HD 126129
Radial velocity (R_{v})	−22.6 km/s
Proper motion (μ)	RA: −75.188 mas/yr Dec.: −9.265 mas/yr
Parallax (π)	14.3216±0.1123 mas
Distance	228 ± 2 ly (69.8 ± 0.5 pc)

HD 126128
Radial velocity (R_{v})	−17.6 km/s
Proper motion (μ)	RA: −83.783 mas/yr Dec.: −4.601 mas/yr
Parallax (π)	9.7572±0.7363 mas
Distance	330 ± 30 ly (102 ± 8 pc)

Orbit
Primary	B
Name	C
Period (P)	40.0 yr
Semi-major axis (a)	0.24″
Eccentricity (e)	0.25
Inclination (i)	42°

Details

HD 126129
Mass	2.4 M_{☉}
Radius	2.4 R_{☉}
Luminosity	47 L_{☉}
Surface gravity (log g)	3.95 cgs
Temperature	9,729 K
Rotational velocity (v sin i)	133 km/s
Age	381 Myr

B
Mass	1.37 M_{☉}
Rotational velocity (v sin i)	133 km/s

C
Mass	1.31 M_{☉}

Other designations
- BD+09°2882, HIP 70327, ADS 9247, WDS J14234+0827
- HD 126129: HD 126129, HR 5386, SAO 120426
- HD 126128: HD 126128, HR 5385

Database references
SIMBAD	data
- HD 126129
- HD 126128

HD 126129 and HD 126128 form a triple star in the northern constellation of Boötes. HD 126128 is a very close pair which lies at an angular separation of 6.250″ from the brightest member of the trio, HD 126129.

The Hipparcos parallax for the combined triple is 15.17±0.42 mas, suggesting a distance around 215 light years. The Gaia DR3 parallax for HD 126129 (component A) indicates a distance close to 228 light years. Gaia DR3 does not contain a parallax for the BC pair HD 126128, but Gaia DR2 indicates an approximate distance of 330 light years. However, the stars are treated as being related and both are considered members of the IC 2391 supercluster.
