= CY Boötis =

Star in the constellation Boötes

- Location of CY Boötis (circled)

Observation data Epoch J2000 Equinox ICRS
- Constellation: Boötes
- Right ascension: 14^{h} 17^{m} 28.4519^{s}
- Declination: +15° 15′ 48.167″
- Apparent magnitude (V): 5.74 - 5.90

Characteristics
- Evolutionary stage: AGB
- Spectral type: M3IIIa
- B−V color index: 1.678
- Variable type: SRb

Astrometry
Radial velocity (R_{v})	−11.30 km/s
Proper motion (μ)	RA: 14.27 mas/yr Dec.: 8.80 mas/yr
Parallax (π)	3.3735±0.1766 mas
Distance	970 ± 50 ly (300 ± 20 pc)
Absolute magnitude (M_{V})	−0.98

Details
Mass	1.2 M_{☉}
Radius	76.78 R_{☉}
Luminosity	1,078 L_{☉}
Surface gravity (log g)	1.35 cgs
Temperature	3,682 K
Metallicity	−0.31

Other designations
- 101 Vir, CY Boötis, NSV 6613, AG+15°1445, BD+15°2690, GC 19284, HD 125180, HIP 69829, HR 5352, SAO 100956, PPM 130465, TYC 1469-1456-1, GCRV 8358, GSC 01469-01456, IRAS 14150+1529, 2MASS J14172843+1515478

Database references
SIMBAD	data

Data sources:

Hipparcos Catalogue, Bright Star Catalogue (5th rev. ed.)

CY Boötis (Flamsteed: 101 Virginis) is a red giant variable star in the constellation Boötes, currently on the asymptotic giant branch. Its apparent magnitude ranges from 5.74 to 5.9, making it faintly visible to the naked eye under good observing conditions. It was originally catalogued as 101 Virginis by Flamsteed due to an error in the position. John R. Percy found it to be "marginally variable" in 1993. When it was confirmed as a variable star, it was actually within the border of the constellation Boötes and given its name.

The variability is not strongly defined but a primary period of 23 days and a secondary period of 340 days have been reported.

CY Boo is listed in the Hipparcos catalogue as a "problem binary", a star which was suspected of being multiple but for which the Hipparcos observations did not give a satisfactory solution. Further observations have always shown it to be single.
