= 50 Boötis =

Star in the constellation Boötes

Observation data Epoch J2000 Equinox J2000
- Constellation: Boötes
- Right ascension: 15^{h} 21^{m} 48.57546^{s}
- Declination: +32° 56′ 01.2942″
- Apparent magnitude (V): 5.38

Characteristics
- Spectral type: B9 Vn
- B−V color index: −0.051±0.002

Astrometry
Radial velocity (R_{v})	−9.0±3.5 km/s
Proper motion (μ)	RA: −48.846 mas/yr Dec.: +13.916 mas/yr
Parallax (π)	11.8607±0.1288 mas
Distance	275 ± 3 ly (84.3 ± 0.9 pc)
Absolute magnitude (M_{V})	0.86

Details
Mass	3.31 M_{☉}
Radius	3.1 R_{☉}
Luminosity	55.17 L_{☉}
Surface gravity (log g)	4.35 cgs
Temperature	12,140±413 K
Rotational velocity (v sin i)	232 km/s
Age	174 Myr

Other designations
- 50 Boo, BD+33°2581, FK5 1395, GC 20672, HD 136849, HIP 75178, HR 5718, SAO 64656

Database references
SIMBAD	data

50 Boötis is a single star located 275 light years away from the Sun in the northern constellation of Boötes. It is visible to the naked eye as a dim, blue-white hued star with an apparent visual magnitude of 5.38. The object is moving closer to the Earth with a heliocentric radial velocity of −9 km/s.

This is a B-type main-sequence star with a stellar classification of B9 Vn, where the 'n' notation indicates "nebulous" lines due to rapid rotation. It is 174 million years old with a projected rotational velocity of 232 km/s. The star has 3.31 times the mass of the Sun and about 3.1 times the Sun's radius. It is radiating 55 times the Sun's luminosity from its photosphere at an effective temperature of 12,140 K.
