= 15 Boötis =

Binary star in the northern constellation of Boötes

Observation data Epoch J2000 Equinox ICRS
- Constellation: Boötes
- Right ascension: 14^{h} 14^{m} 50.85024^{s}
- Declination: +10° 06′ 02.1964″
- Apparent magnitude (V): 5.45 (5.51 + 8.53)

Characteristics
- Evolutionary stage: red clump
- Spectral type: K1 III
- B−V color index: 1.007±0.003

Astrometry
Radial velocity (R_{v})	+16.80±0.40 km/s
Proper motion (μ)	RA: −20.83 mas/yr Dec.: −164.41 mas/yr
Parallax (π)	12.31±0.59 mas
Distance	260 ± 10 ly (81 ± 4 pc)
Absolute magnitude (M_{V})	0.75

Details
Mass	1.48±0.42 M_{☉}
Radius	10 R_{☉}
Luminosity	61.08 L_{☉}
Surface gravity (log g)	2.55±0.11 cgs
Temperature	4,845±92 K
Metallicity [Fe/H]	−0.26 dex
Rotational velocity (v sin i)	0.0 km/s
Age	2.0+0.8 −0.6 Myr

Other designations
- 15 Boo, BD+10°2654, FK5 3131, GC 19226, HD 124679, HIP 69612, HR 5330, SAO 100934, CCDM 14148+1006, WDS J14148+1006

Database references
SIMBAD	data

15 Boötis is a binary star system in the northern constellation of Boötes, located approximately 260 light years away from the Sun. It is visible to the naked eye as a dim, orange-hued star with an apparent visual magnitude of 5.45. The system has a relatively high proper motion, traversing the celestial sphere at the rate of 0.166 arc seconds per annum. It is moving away from the Earth with a heliocentric radial velocity of +16.8 km/s.

The magnitude 5.51 primary, designated component A, is an aging K-type giant star with a stellar classification of K1 III. It is a red clump giant, which indicates it is on the horizontal branch and is generating energy through helium fusion at its core. It is around two billion years old with 1.5 times the mass of the Sun and has expanded to 10 times the Sun's radius. The star is radiating 61 times the luminosity of the Sun from its swollen photosphere at an effective temperature of 4,845 K.

Its companion, component B, is a magnitude +8.53 star was located at an angular separation of 0.80″ along a position angle of 111° from the primary, as of 2015. This is the same separation it had when the system was discovered in 1936.
