= HD 128333 =

Star in the constellation Boötes

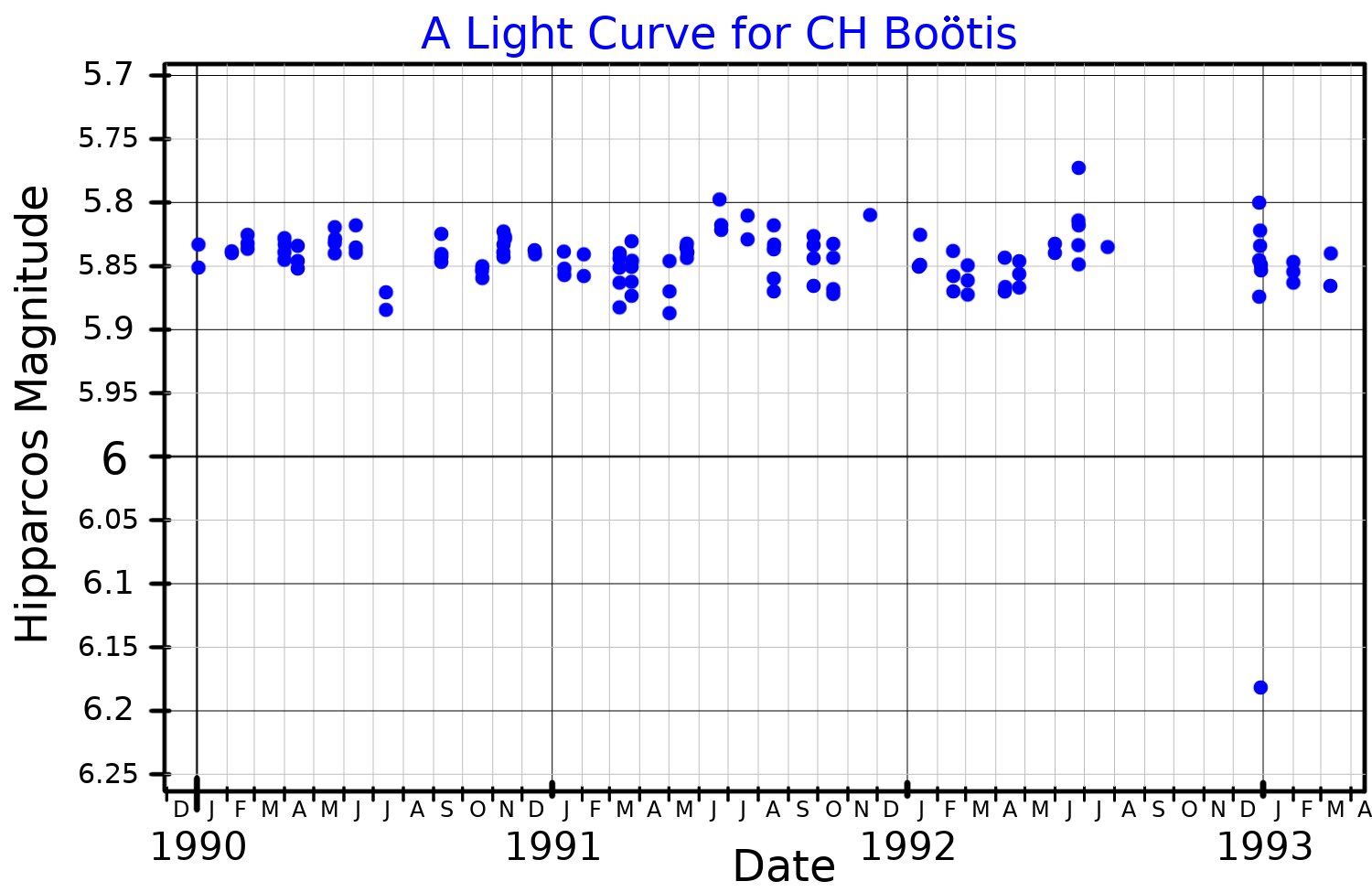
- A light curve for CH Boötes, plotted from Hipparcos data

Observation data Epoch J2000 Equinox ICRS
- Constellation: Boötes
- Right ascension: 14^{h} 34^{m} 39.62069^{s}
- Declination: +49° 22′ 06.0729″
- Apparent magnitude (V): 5.74

Characteristics
- Evolutionary stage: AGB
- Spectral type: M1III
- U−B color index: +1.88
- B−V color index: +1.56
- Variable type: Lb

Astrometry
Radial velocity (R_{v})	−23.93 km/s
Proper motion (μ)	RA: −45.517 mas/yr Dec.: +49.940 mas/yr
Parallax (π)	4.6569±0.0526 mas
Distance	700 ± 8 ly (215 ± 2 pc)
Absolute magnitude (M_{V})	−0.32

Details
Mass	1.13 M_{☉}
Radius	67 R_{☉}
Luminosity	869 L_{☉}
Surface gravity (log g)	1.00 cgs
Temperature	3,734 K
Metallicity [Fe/H]	+0.10 dex

Other designations
- CH Boötis, BD+50 2095, FK5 3155, HD 128333, HIP 71280, HR 5452, SAO 45121.

Database references
SIMBAD	data

HD 128333 or CH Boötis is an irregular variable star in the northern constellation of Boötes. With an apparent magnitude of 5.7, it is faintly visibly to the naked eye under good observing conditions.

The variability of the brightness of HD 128333 was announced by Joel Stebbins and Charles Morse Huffer in 1928, based on observations made at Washburn Observatory. It was given its variable star designation, CH Boötis, in 1977.

It is currently on the asymptotic giant branch of the HR diagram.
