= BP Boötis =

Star in the constellation Boötes

- Location of BP Boötis (circled)

Observation data Epoch J2000 Equinox ICRS
- Constellation: Boötes
- Right ascension: 15^{h} 42^{m} 50.760818^{s}
- Declination: +52° 21′ 39.24441″
- Apparent magnitude (V): 5.48

Characteristics
- Spectral type: A0 Vp Si Cr
- B−V color index: −0.042±0.004
- Variable type: α^{2} CVn

Astrometry
Radial velocity (R_{v})	−16.1±2.8 km/s
Proper motion (μ)	RA: −66.214 mas/yr Dec.: +29.308 mas/yr
Parallax (π)	10.92±0.18 mas
Distance	299 ± 5 ly (92 ± 2 pc)
Absolute magnitude (M_{V})	+0.48

Details
Mass	2.58±0.07 M_{☉}
Radius	2.7±0.2 R_{☉}
Luminosity	65 L_{☉}
Surface gravity (log g)	3.99±0.07 cgs
Temperature	9,954 K
Rotation	1.29557 days
Rotational velocity (v sin i)	69 km/s
Age	170 Myr

Other designations
- BP Boo, BD+52°1898, FK5 3247, GC 21154, HD 140728, HIP 76957, HR 5857, SAO 29628

Database references
SIMBAD	data

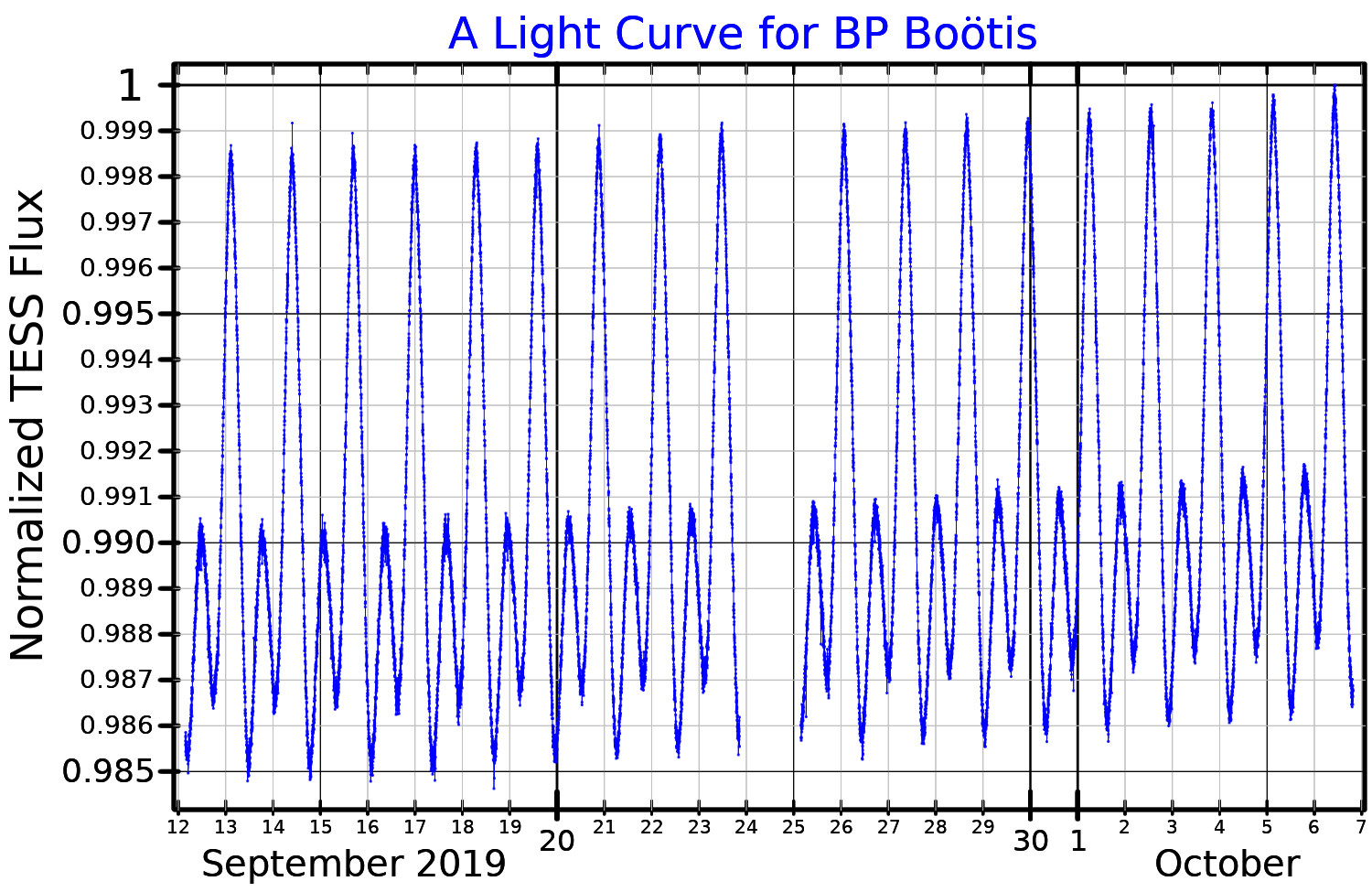
Light curve for BP Boötis, plotted from TESSdata

BP Boötis is a solitary variable star in the northern constellation of Boötes, near the northern constellation border with Draco. It is visible to the naked eye as a dim, white-hued star with an apparent visual magnitude that fluctuates around 5.48. The star is located 299 light years away from the Sun based on parallax, but is drifting closer with a radial velocity of −16 km/s.

The star, often called HD 140728 before it was known to be variable, was transferred from Boötes to Quadrans Muralis. Later, when the International Astronomical Union officially recognised constellations, Quadrans Muralis became obsolete, so this star was moved back to Boötes. In 1962, William Wehlau announced that the star's brightness varied, based on observations made from 1958 through 1960.

This is an Ap star with a stellar classification of A0 Vp Si Cr, showing abundance anomalies of silicon and chromium. It is an Alpha^{2} Canum Venaticorum variable that varies in brightness by 0.02 magnitude over a period of 1.3 days. The distribution of silicon across the surface appears to be associated with the magnetic field of the star, with depleted regions appearing around the magnetic poles.

BP Boötis is 170 million years old with a projected rotational velocity of 69 km/s, having a rotation period of 1.29557 days. It has 2.6 times the mass of the Sun and 2.7 times the Sun's radius. The star is radiating 65 times the luminosity of the Sun from its photosphere at an effective temperature of 9,954 K.
