= HD 128311 b =

Jovian planet orbiting HD 128311

Discovery
- Discovered by: Butler et al.
- Discovery site: California, United States
- Discovery date: 2002
- Detection method: Doppler Spectroscopy

Orbital characteristics
- Apastron: 1.412 AU (211,200,000 km)
- Periastron: 0.756 AU (113,100,000 km)
- Semi-major axis: 1.084 ± 0.006 AU (162,160,000 ± 900,000 km)
- Eccentricity: 0.303±0.011
- Orbital period (sidereal): 453.019 ± 0.404 d (1.24030 ± 0.00111 a)
- Average orbital speed: 26.2
- Inclination: >30
- Time of periastron: 2450198.691±4.472
- Argument of periastron: 57.864±3.258
- Semi-amplitude: 55.627±0.456
- Star: HD 128311

Physical characteristics
- Mass: ≥1.769±0.023 M_{J}

HD 128311 b is an exoplanet located approximately 54 light-years away in the constellation of Boötes. This planet orbits in an eccentric orbit about 1.084 AU from its star (HD 128311). The planet has a minimum mass of 1.769 Jupiter masses.
