= HD 128311 c =

Exoplanet in the constellation Boötes

Discovery
- Discovered by: Vogt et al.
- Discovery site: California, United States
- Discovery date: June 24, 2005
- Detection method: Doppler spectroscopy

Orbital characteristics
- Apastron: 2.02 AU (302,000,000 km)
- Periastron: 1.46 AU (218,000,000 km)
- Semi-major axis: 1.740 ± 0.010 AU (260,300,000 ± 1,500,000 km)
- Eccentricity: 0.159±0.006
- Orbital period (sidereal): 921.538 ± 1.15 d (2.52303 ± 0.00315 a)
- Average orbital speed: 20.7
- Inclination: 55.950±14.553
- Longitude of ascending node: 229.392±14.473
- Time of periastron: 2449565.615±18.01
- Argument of periastron: 15.445±6.87
- Semi-amplitude: 74.799±1.497
- Star: HD 128311

Physical characteristics
- Mass: 3.789+0.924 −0.432 M_{J}

HD 128311 c is an exoplanet located approximately 54 light-years away in the constellation of Boötes. This planet orbits in an eccentric orbit at 1.74 AU from its star (HD 128311). The planet has a minimum mass of 3.22 M_{J}, and astrometric observations in 2014 revealed its true mass to be 3.789 M_{J}.
