= 26 Boötis =

Star in the constellation Boötes

Observation data Epoch J2000 Equinox ICRS
- Constellation: Boötes
- Right ascension: 14^{h} 32^{m} 32.5423^{s}
- Declination: +22° 15′ 36.2044″
- Apparent magnitude (V): 5.91

Characteristics
- Spectral type: F2 IV
- B−V color index: 0.391±0.005

Astrometry
Radial velocity (R_{v})	−16.5±1.8 km/s
Proper motion (μ)	RA: −127.019 mas/yr Dec.: +39.662 mas/yr
Parallax (π)	17.3311±0.0774 mas
Distance	188.2 ± 0.8 ly (57.7 ± 0.3 pc)
Absolute magnitude (M_{V})	2.20

Details
Mass	1.46 M_{☉}
Radius	2.43+0.03 −0.06 R_{☉}
Luminosity	11.553±0.065 L_{☉}
Surface gravity (log g)	3.93 cgs
Temperature	6,826+40.5 −88.5 K
Metallicity [Fe/H]	0.08 dex
Rotational velocity (v sin i)	55.8±2.8 km/s
Age	1.557 Gyr

Other designations
- 26 Boo, BD+22°2715, FK5 3151, GC 19611, HD 127739, HIP 71115, HR 5434, SAO 83395

Database references
SIMBAD	data

26 Boötis is a single star in the northern constellation of Boötes, located 188 light years away from the Sun. It is visible to the naked eye as a dim, yellow-white hued star with an apparent visual magnitude of 5.91. This object is moving closer to the Earth with a heliocentric radial velocity of −16.5 km/s.

This is an F-type subgiant star with a stellar classification of F2 IV, which suggests it has exhausted the supply of hydrogen at its core and is in the process of evolving into a giant. It is an estimated 1.6 billion years old with 1.46 times the mass of the Sun and 2.43 times the Sun's radius. The star is radiating 11.6 times the Sun's luminosity from its photosphere at an effective temperature of 6,826 K. The rotation rate is moderately high, with a projected rotational velocity of 56 km/s. 26 Boötis is a known source of radio emission.
