= 10 Boötis =

Star in the constellation Boötes

Observation data Epoch J2000 Equinox J2000
- Constellation: Boötes
- Right ascension: 13^{h} 58^{m} 38.92101^{s}
- Declination: +21° 41′ 46.3302″
- Apparent magnitude (V): 5.76

Characteristics
- Evolutionary stage: main sequence
- Spectral type: A0 Vs
- B−V color index: −0.002±0.004

Astrometry
Radial velocity (R_{v})	+6.1±2.9 km/s
Proper motion (μ)	RA: −3.641 mas/yr Dec.: −42.535 mas/yr
Parallax (π)	6.1741±0.1059 mas
Distance	528 ± 9 ly (162 ± 3 pc)
Absolute magnitude (M_{V})	−0.01

Details
Mass	2.87±0.14 M_{☉}
Radius	2.7 R_{☉}
Luminosity	113+32 −25 L_{☉}
Temperature	9441±108 K
Rotational velocity (v sin i)	75 km/s
Age	337 Myr

Other designations
- 10 Boo, BD+22°2650, HD 121996, HIP 68276, HR 5255, SAO 83103

Database references
SIMBAD	data

10 Boötis is a suspected astrometric binary star system in the northern constellation of Boötes, located around 528 light years away from the Sun. It is visible to the naked eye under suitable viewing conditions as a dim, white-hued star with an apparent visual magnitude of 5.76. Its magnitude is diminished by an extinction of 0.17 due to interstellar dust. This system is moving away from the Earth with a heliocentric radial velocity of +6 km/s.

The visible component is an ordinary A-type main-sequence star with a stellar classification of A0 Vs, where the 's' notation indicates "sharp" absorption lines. It is 337 million years old with a moderate rotation rate, showing a projected rotational velocity of 75 km/s. The star has 2.87 times the mass of the Sun and about 2.7 times the Sun's radius. It is radiating 113 times the Sun's luminosity from its photosphere at an effective temperature of 9,441 K.
