= WASP-14b =

Super Jupiter orbiting WASP-14

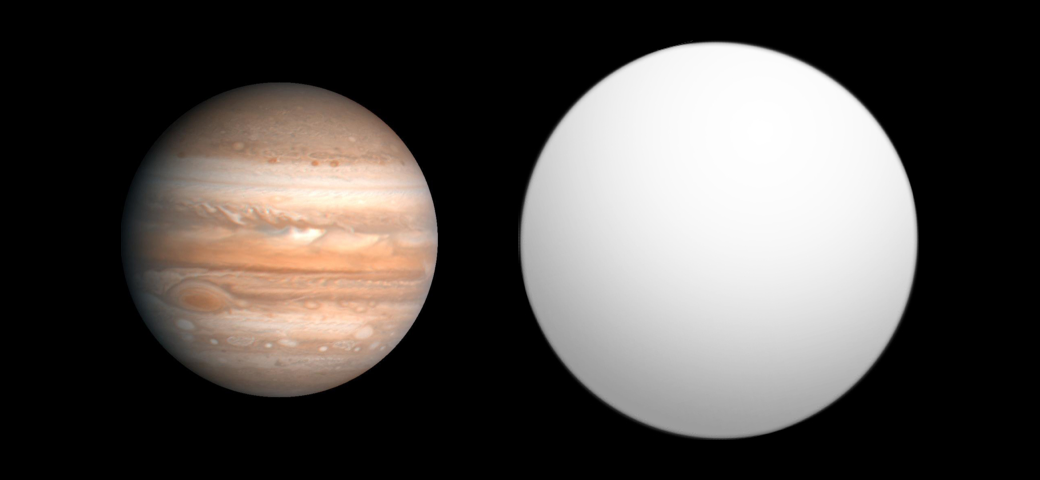
- Size comparison of WASP-14b with Jupiter.

Discovery
- Discovered by: Cameron et al. (SuperWASP)
- Discovery site: SAAO
- Discovery date: April 1, 2008
- Detection method: Transit

Orbital characteristics
- Semi-major axis: 0.037^{+0.001}_{−0.002} AU
- Eccentricity: 0.095^{+0.004}_{−0.007}
- Orbital period (sidereal): 2.243756^{+5E-6}_{−1E-6} d
- Inclination: 84.79^{+0.52}_{−0.67}
- Argument of periastron: 254.9^{+0.92}_{−1.72}
- Star: WASP-14

Physical characteristics
- Mean radius: 1.259^{+0.08}_{−0.058} R_{J}
- Mass: 7.725^{+0.43}_{−0.67} M_{J}
- Mean density: 5.133 g/cm^{3}
- Surface gravity: 126.2 m/s^{2} (414 ft/s^{2}); 12.87 g
- Temperature: 2800

WASP-14b is an extrasolar planet discovered in 2008 by SuperWASP using the transit method. Follow-up radial velocity measurements showed that the mass of WASP-14b is almost eight times larger than that of Jupiter. The radius found by the transit observations show that it has a radius 25% larger than Jupiter. This makes WASP-14b one of the densest exoplanets known. Its radius best fits the model of Jonathan Fortney.

== Orbit ==
First calculation of WASP-14b's Rossiter–McLaughlin effect and so spin-orbit angle was −14 ± 17 degrees. It is too eccentric for its age and so is possibly pulled into its orbit by another planet. The study in 2012 has updated spin-orbit angle to 33.1±7.4°.
