= HD 128311 =

Star in the constellation Boötes

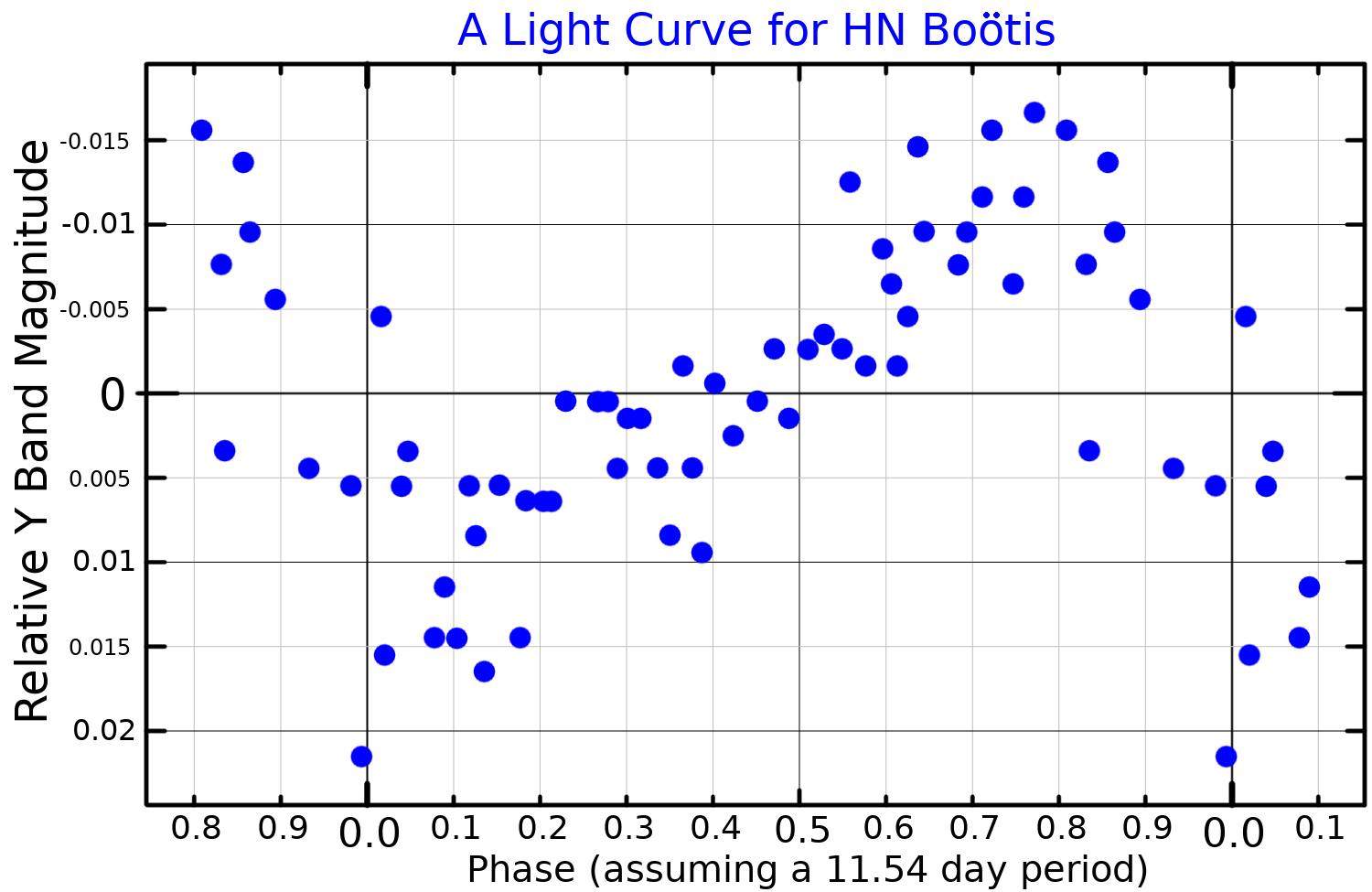
- A near infrared (Y band) light curve for HN Boötes, adapted from Strassmeier et al. (2000)

Observation data Epoch J2000 Equinox ICRS
- Constellation: Boötes
- Right ascension: 14^{h} 36^{m} 00.56073^{s}
- Declination: +09° 44′ 47.4536″
- Apparent magnitude (V): 7.48

Characteristics
- Spectral type: K3V
- B−V color index: 0.973±0.004
- Variable type: BY Dra

Astrometry
Radial velocity (R_{v})	−9.62±0.15 km/s
Proper motion (μ)	RA: 204.360 mas/yr Dec.: −250.390 mas/yr
Parallax (π)	61.2111±0.0740 mas
Distance	53.28 ± 0.06 ly (16.34 ± 0.02 pc)
Absolute magnitude (M_{V})	6.39

Details
Mass	0.82 M_{☉}
Radius	0.78±0.01 R_{☉}
Luminosity	0.308±0.001 L_{☉}
Surface gravity (log g)	4.58 cgs
Temperature	4,863+46 −15 K
Metallicity [Fe/H]	0.08 dex 0.12 dex
Rotational velocity (v sin i)	5.6 km/s
Age	0.5–1.0 Gyr; 6.35 Gyr

Other designations
- HN Boo, BD+10°2710, GC 19679, GJ 3860, HD 128311, HIP 71395, SAO 120554, LTT 14312, GSC 00910-00165

Database references
SIMBAD	data
ARICNS	data

HD 128311 is a variable star in the northern constellation of Boötes. It has the variable star designation HN Boötis, while HD 128311 is the star's designation in the Henry Draper Catalogue. The star is invisible to the naked eye with an apparent visual magnitude that fluctuates around 7.48. It is located at a distance of 53 light years from the Sun based on parallax, but is drifting closer with a radial velocity of −9.6 km/s. Two confirmed extrasolar planets have been detected in orbit around this star.

The stellar classification of HN Boo is K3V, which indicates this is a K-type main sequence star. Klaus G. Strassmeier et al. announced that the star's brightness varies, in the year 2000. It was given its variable star designation in 2006. It is a BY Draconis-type variable, randomly varying in brightness by 0.04 in magnitude over a period of 11.54 days due to star spots and high chromospheric activity. The star exhibits strong emission, which suggests an age of 0.5–1.0 billion years. It has 82% of the mass of the Sun and 78% of the Sun's radius. The metallicity of the star, meaning its abundance of heavier elements, appears slightly higher than in the Sun. It is radiating 31% of the luminosity of the Sun from its photosphere at an effective temperature of 4,863 K.

== Planetary system ==
The HD 128311 planetary system
Companion (in order from star)	Mass	Semimajor axis (AU)	Orbital period (days)	Eccentricity	Inclination (°)	Radius
d (unconfirmed)	≥0.133±0.005 M_{J}	0.092±0.004	11.2210±0.0008	0.196±0.030	—	—
b	1.9+0.7 −0.3 M_{J}	1.09±0.01	453.019±0.404	0.30±0.04	90+30 −40	—
c	3.4+0.6 −0.2 M_{J}	1.75±0.02	921.538±1.15	0.19+0.05 −0.07	70+40 −20	—

In 2002, the discovery of the exoplanet HD 128311 b was announced by Paul Butler. In 2005, the discovery of a second exoplanet HD 128311 c was announced by Steve Vogt.

Most likely, the system has been formed in a very turbulent disc. The authors were able to show with both analytic and numerical models that certain libration modes are readily excited by turbulence. It was initially thought that the system could have been resulted from planet–planet scattering, but this is rather unlikely.

In 2014, the true mass of HD 128311 c was measured via astrometry. The same study also proposed a third planetary candidate, but it has not been confirmed. In 2026, the mass of HD 128311 b was also measured with astrometry.

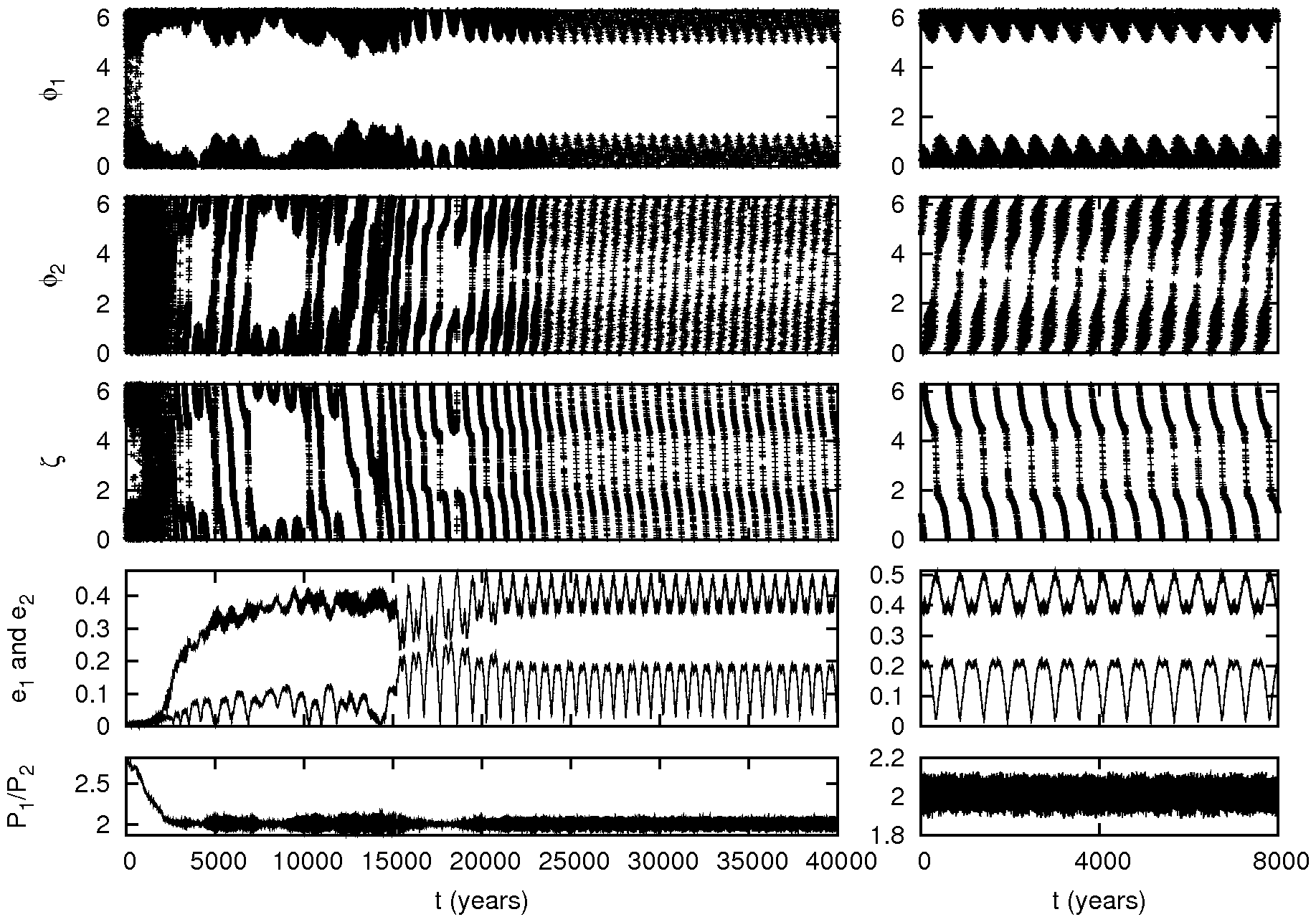
Time evolution of orbital elements in the system HD128311. This left panel in this plot shows the most likely formation scenario for the planetary system. The right panel shows the observed orbital configuration.
