= HD 132406 b =

Long period Jovian exoplanet orbiting HD 132406

Discovery
- Discovered by: Da Silva et al.
- Discovery site: Geneva observatory, Switzerland
- Discovery date: 2007
- Detection method: Radial velocity

Orbital characteristics
- Semi-major axis: 1.969+0.06 −0.064 AU
- Eccentricity: 0.303+0.093 −0.077
- Orbital period (sidereal): 964±40 d 2.64±0.11 yr
- Inclination: 116°+19° −18°
- Longitude of ascending node: 74°+79° −52°
- Time of periastron: 2455414+45 −51
- Argument of periastron: 219°+20° −19°
- Semi-amplitude: 72.06
- Star: HD 132406

Physical characteristics
- Mass: 6.2+2.2 −1.1 M_{J}

HD 132406 b is a long-period, massive gas giant exoplanet orbiting the Sun-like star HD 132406. HD 132406 b has a minimum mass 5.61 times the mass of Jupiter. The orbital distance from the star is almost twice that of from Earth to the Sun. The orbital period is 2.7 years.

An astrometric measurement of the planet's inclination and true mass was published in 2022 as part of Gaia DR3, and this was updated in 2023.
