= HD 123657 =

Star in the constellation Boötes

HD 123657 (BY Boötis)
- Location of BY Boö (circled)

Observation data Epoch J2000 Equinox ICRS
- Constellation: Boötes
- Right ascension: 14^{h} 07^{m} 55.755^{s}
- Declination: +43° 51′ 16.03″
- Apparent magnitude (V): 4.98–5.33

Characteristics
- Evolutionary stage: AGB
- Spectral type: M4.5III
- U−B color index: 1.66
- B−V color index: 1.58
- R−I color index: 1.66
- Variable type: LB

Astrometry
Radial velocity (R_{v})	−36.24 km/s
Proper motion (μ)	RA: +11.443 mas/yr Dec.: −30.812 mas/yr
Parallax (π)	6.0110±0.1554 mas
Distance	540 ± 10 ly (166 ± 4 pc)
Absolute magnitude (M_{V})	−0.90

Details
Mass	3.96 M_{☉}
Radius	131.7+3.4 −3.5 R_{☉}
Luminosity	2,100±300 L_{☉}
Surface gravity (log g)	0.66 cgs
Temperature	3,400+100 −120 K
Metallicity [Fe/H]	−0.03 dex

Other designations
- BY Boötis, HD 123657, HIP 69038, HR 5299, GSC 03040-00969, TYC 3040-969-1, BD+44°2325, IRAS 14059+4405, IRC +40253, SAO 44901

Database references
SIMBAD	data

HD 123657 (BY Boötis) is a star in the northern constellation of Boötes, near the end of the handle of the Big Dipper. It is a fifth-magnitude star, and can be spotted to the unaided eye in sufficiently dark skies, far from light pollution. Based on stellar parallax measurements, it is about 540 light-years distant.

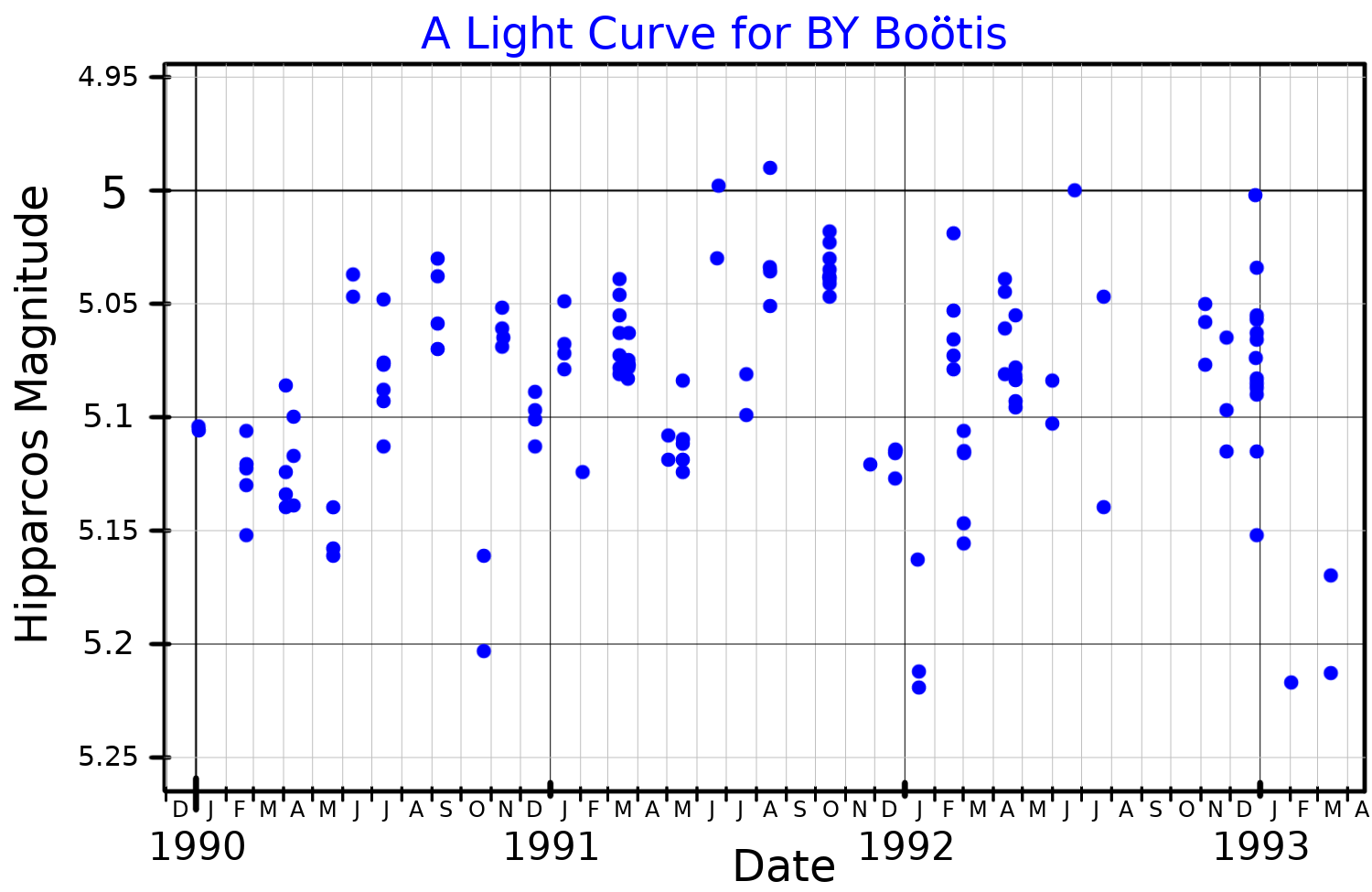
A light curve for BY Boötis, plotted from Hipparcos data

This is a slow irregular variable with an apparent magnitude varying between 4.98 and 5.33. The variability of the brightness of HD 123657 was announced by Joel Stebbins and Charles Morse Huffer in 1928, based on observations made at Washburn Observatory. The star was given its variable star designation, BY Boötis, in 1973.

HD 123657 has a spectral classification of M4.5III, placing it as a cool red giant that exhausted its hydrogen supply. It has expanded to over 132 times the size of the Sun, now radiating 2,100 times its luminosity at a cool photosphere that has an effective temperature of 3,400 K.
