= HD 130144 =

Star in the constellation Boötes

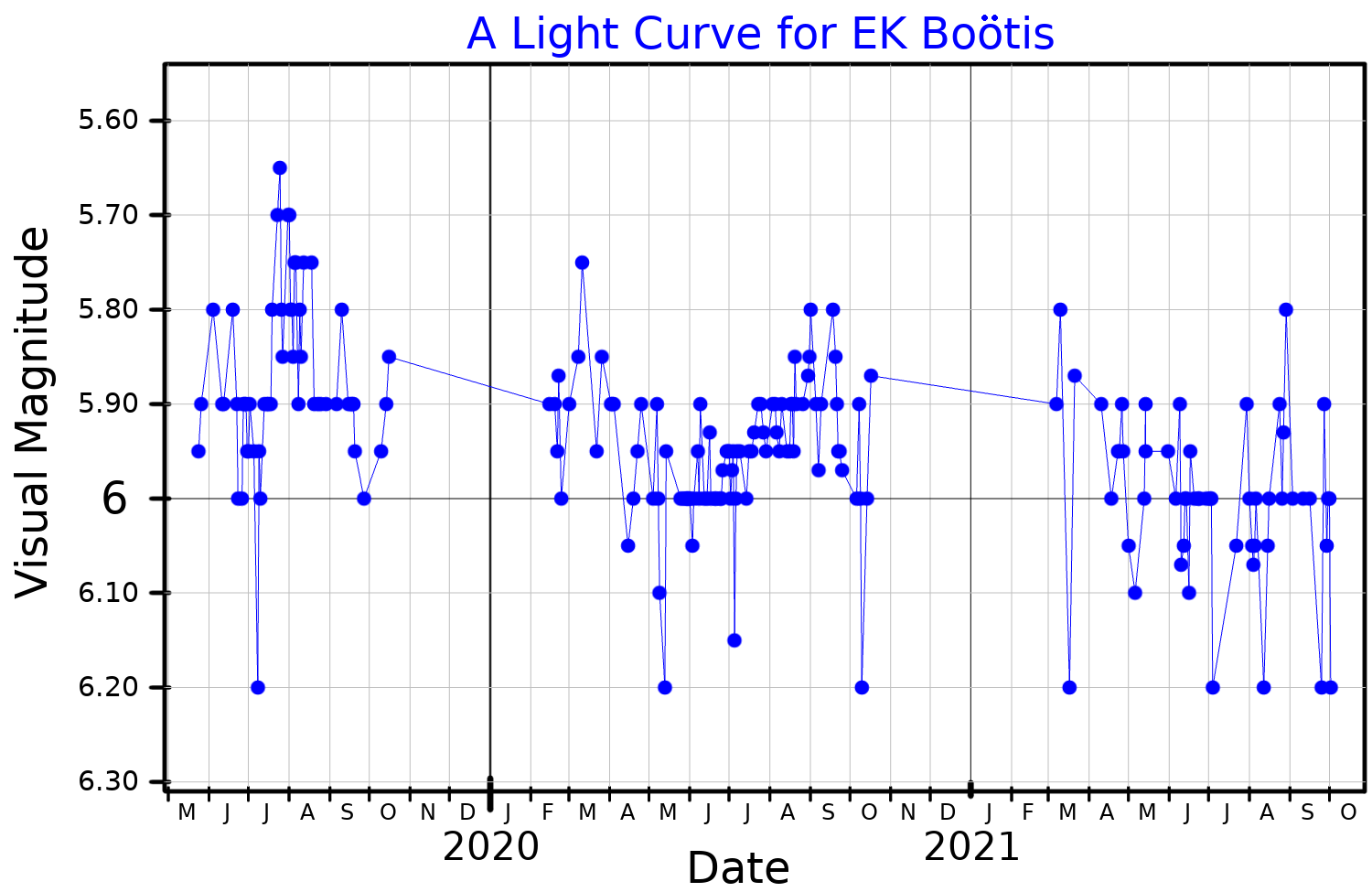
- The visual band light curve of EK Boötes, from AAVSO data

Observation data Epoch J2000 Equinox J2000
- Constellation: Boötes
- Right ascension: 14^{h} 46^{m} 05.94566^{s}
- Declination: +15° 07′ 54.4332″
- Apparent magnitude (V): 5.33 to 5.71

Characteristics
- Spectral type: M5III
- U−B color index: +1.26
- B−V color index: 1.335±0.021
- Variable type: Lb?

Astrometry
Radial velocity (R_{v})	−22.52±0.65 km/s
Proper motion (μ)	RA: −85.49 mas/yr Dec.: +18.86 mas/yr
Parallax (π)	4.04±0.38 mas
Distance	810 ± 80 ly (250 ± 20 pc)
Absolute magnitude (M_{V})	−1.17

Details
Mass	3.1±0.5 M_{☉}
Radius	210±21 R_{☉}
Luminosity	521.51 L_{☉}
Temperature	3,400 K
Rotational velocity (v sin i)	8.5 or 11 km/s

Other designations
- EK Boo, BD+15°2758, FK5 3168, HD 130144, HIP 72208, HR 5512, SAO 101200

Database references
SIMBAD	data

HD 130144 is a variable star in the northern constellation of Boötes. It has the variable star designation EK Boötis (or EK Boo), while HD 130144 is the designation from the Henry Draper Catalogue. The star is faintly visible to the naked eye with an apparent visual magnitude that ranges from 5.33 down to 5.71. Parallax measurements provide a distance estimate of approximately 810 light years from the Sun. It is drifting closer with a radial velocity of −23 km/s.

The brightness of HD 130144 was discovered to be variable when the Hipparcos satellite data was analyzed. It was given its variable star designation in 1999. This is an aging red giant star with a stellar classification of M5III. It has an estimated 3.1 times the mass of the Sun and has expanded to around 210 times the Sun's radius. EK Boo is classified as a slow irregular variable that ranges in luminosity with an amplitude of 0.38 in magnitude and no apparent periodicity. This is an X-ray source, and was possibly the first M-type giant star to have a magnetic field directly detected. The strength of the field ranges from –0.1 to 8 G.

HD 130144 has a high rotation rate for a star of this class, which may be the result of dredge-up of angular momentum from the interior, or else a merger with an orbiting companion. A long-term trend in the radial velocity data suggests this star has an orbiting companion. Most likely this is an active red dwarf that is responsible for most of the X-ray emission from the system. There is nearby visual companion at an angular separation of 0.20″ along a position angle of 82.2° (as of 2010).
