= WASP-14 =

Star in the constellation Boötes

Observation data Epoch J2000 Equinox ICRS
- Constellation: Boötes
- Right ascension: 14^{h} 33^{m} 06.3572^{s}
- Declination: +21° 53′ 40.981″
- Apparent magnitude (V): 9.745±0.026

Characteristics
- Evolutionary stage: main sequence
- Spectral type: F5V
- Variable type: planetary transit

Astrometry
Radial velocity (R_{v})	−5.21±0.27 km/s
Proper motion (μ)	RA: 29.428 mas/yr Dec.: −6.864 mas/yr
Parallax (π)	6.2205±0.0172 mas
Distance	524 ± 1 ly (160.8 ± 0.4 pc)

Details
Mass	1.21+0.13 −0.12 M_{☉}
Radius	1.306+0.066 −0.073 R_{☉}
Surface gravity (log g)	4.312+0.061 −0.047 cgs
Temperature	6480±100 K
Metallicity [Fe/H]	0.0±0.2 dex
Rotational velocity (v sin i)	4.9±1.0 km/s
Age	750±250 Myr

Other designations
- BD+22 2716, SAO 83398, PPM 103396, TOI-5631, TIC 347430350, WASP-14, TYC 1482-882-1, GSC 01482-00882, 2MASS J14330635+2153409

Database references
SIMBAD	data
Exoplanet Archive	data

WASP-14 or BD+22 2716 is a star 524 light-years away in the constellation Boötes. It hosts a transiting planet discovered by the SuperWASP project. There is a 0.33±0.04 M_{☉} companion star at a separation of 300±20 AU.

== Planetary system ==
WASP-14b is an exoplanet discovered in 2008. It is a massive hot Jupiter on a moderately eccentric orbit. At the time of discovery, it was one of the densest exoplanets known. Its radius best fits the model of Fortney.

The WASP-14 planetary system
Companion (in order from star)	Mass	Semimajor axis (AU)	Orbital period (days)	Eccentricity	Inclination (°)	Radius
b	7.22+0.49 −0.50 M_{J}	0.0358+0.0012 −0.0013	2.2437661(11)	0.0782+0.0014 −0.0012	84.32+0.67 −0.57	1.281+0.075 −0.082 R_{J}
