= BX Boötis =

Star in the constellation Boötes

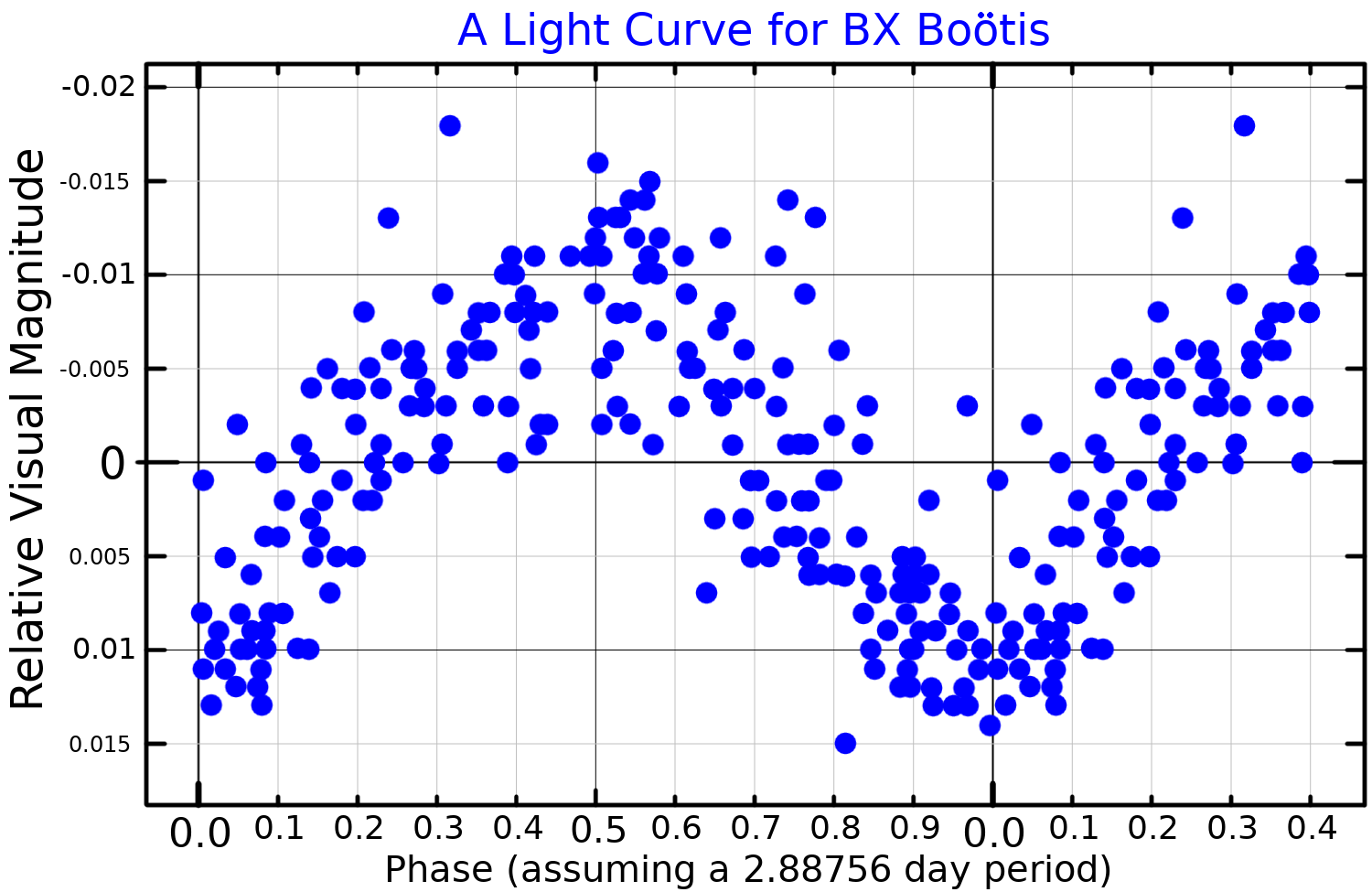
- The visual band light curve of BX Boötes, adapted from Adelman (2008)

Observation data Epoch J2000 Equinox ICRS
- Constellation: Boötes
- Right ascension: 15^{h} 00^{m} 38.7179^{s}
- Declination: +47° 16′ 38.792″
- Apparent magnitude (V): 6.33 to 6.41

Characteristics
- Spectral type: A0 Vsp SiSrCr or B9 Vp SiCrSr
- B−V color index: −0.099±0.004
- Variable type: α^{2} CVn

Astrometry
Radial velocity (R_{v})	−10.7±1.8 km/s
Proper motion (μ)	RA: -8.999 mas/yr Dec.: 15.852 mas/yr
Parallax (π)	6.3665±0.0287 mas
Distance	512 ± 2 ly (157.1 ± 0.7 pc)
Absolute magnitude (M_{V})	0.21

Details
Mass	2.70±0.09 M_{☉}
Radius	2.51 R_{☉}
Luminosity	72.4+10.8 −12.1 L_{☉}
Surface gravity (log g)	4.50 cgs
Temperature	9,164 K
Metallicity [Fe/H]	+0.63 dex
Rotation	2.88756 d
Rotational velocity (v sin i)	30 km/s
Age	235 Myr

Other designations
- BX Boo, BD+47° 2192, FK5 3247, HD 133029, HIP 73454, HR 5597, SAO 45326

Database references
SIMBAD	data

BX Boötis is a star in the northern constellation of Boötes. It is a dim star near the lower limit of visibility to the naked eye, having a nominal apparent visual magnitude of 6.35. Based upon an annual parallax shift of 6.3665 mas, it is located 512 light years away. At that distance, the visual magnitude of the star is diminished by an extinction of 0.13 due to interstellar dust. It is moving closer with a heliocentric radial velocity of −11 km/s.

The variability of BX Boötis was probably discovered by Gerhard Robert Miczaika. It was announced in a 1954 IAU publication, where he discusses photo-electric measurements of spectrum variables. He wrote "The magnetic-field variable HD 133129 is likewise variable in magnitude with a small amplitude." HD 133129 is not BX Boötis, but HD 133029 is. Unlike BX Boötis, HD 133129 does not match Miczaika's description of the star. Kukarkin et al. apparently concluded there was a typographical error in Miczaika's announcement, because they cited Miczaika's 1954 announcement when they gave BX Boötis its variable star designation in 1972.

This is a magnetic CP star with a stellar classification of A0 Vsp SiSrCr, indicating this is an A-type main-sequence star. The spectrum has very weak lines of helium but displays strong overabundances of silicon and all of the heavier elements except nickel. It is classified as an Alpha² Canum Venaticorum variable with a magnitude that varies from 6.33 to 6.41 over a period of 2.88756 days.

BX Boötis is 235 million years old with a projected rotational velocity of 30 km/s. It has 2.7 times the mass of the Sun and 2.5 times the Sun's radius. The star is radiating around 72 times the Sun's luminosity from its photosphere at an effective temperature of 9,164 K.
