= 24 Boötis =

Star in the constellation Boötes

- Location of 24 Boötis (circled in red)

Observation data Epoch J2000 Equinox ICRS
- Constellation: Boötes
- Right ascension: 14^{h} 28^{m} 37.81288^{s}
- Declination: +49° 50′ 41.4615″
- Apparent magnitude (V): +5.59

Characteristics
- Evolutionary stage: Red clump
- Spectral type: G4 III-IV Fe-1
- B−V color index: 0.85±0.02

Astrometry
| Radial velocity (R_{v}) | −8.116±0.024 km/s |
| Proper motion (μ) | RA: −303.943 mas/yr Dec.: −46.836 mas/yr |
| Parallax (π) | 10.5895±0.0421 mas |
| Distance | 308 ± 1 ly (94.4 ± 0.4 pc) |
| Absolute magnitude (M_{V}) | +0.59 |

Details
| Mass | 0.88+0.12 −0.11 M_{☉} |
| Radius | 10.2±0.5 R_{☉} |
| Luminosity | 54.97±0.90 L_{☉} |
| Surface gravity (log g) | 2.369±0.016 cgs |
| Temperature | 4,959±21 K |
| Metallicity [Fe/H] | −0.71±0.06 dex |
| Rotational velocity (v sin i) | 2.57±0.73 km/s |
| Age | 9.03 Gyr |

Other designations
- g Boötis, 24 Boo, BD+50°2084, GC 19532, HD 127243, HIP 70791, HR 5420, SAO 29165

Database references
| SIMBAD | data |
| Exoplanet Archive | data |

24 Boötis or g Boötis is a single, yellow-hued star in the constellation Boötes. It is faintly visible to the naked eye with an apparent visual magnitude of +5.59. Based upon an annual parallax shift of 10.59 mas, it is located around 308 light years from the Sun. The star is moving closer to the Sun with a radial velocity of −8 km/s. It is a thick disk star with a high galactic space velocity and an orbital eccentricity of 0.47±0.01 that carries it as close as 3.30±0.05 kpc to the Galactic Center, and as far away as 9.15±0.02 kpc. An extrasolar planet was discovered orbiting this star in 2018.

This is an evolving red giant star with a stellar classification of G4 III-IV Fe-1, with the notation indicating the spectrum shows blended characteristics of a subgiant and giant star with an underabundance of iron. Around 0.88 times the mass of the Sun and nine billion years old, it has expanded to 10 times the Sun's radius and is now in the red clump stage of evolution. The star is radiating 55 times the Sun's luminosity from its enlarged photosphere at an effective temperature of 4,959 K.

== Planetary system ==
24 Boötis b was discovered by Takuya Takarada and collaborators using the Doppler Spectroscopy method, during the Okayama Planet Search radial velocity survey of G and K giants at Okayama Astrophysical Observatory. The preprint announcing the discovery was published on the arXiv eprint repository on April 11, 2018.

The planet orbits around a red clump star, which used to be larger than the planet's orbit in the red-giant branch stage of evolution before undergoing a helium flash and contracting to its current size. The planet would not be expected to survive the red-giant branch stage, defying current models of planetary evolution after the engulfment of an expanding giant star.

The 24 Boötis planetary system
| Companion (in order from star) | Mass | Semimajor axis (AU) | Orbital period (days) | Eccentricity | Inclination (°) | Radius |
|---|---|---|---|---|---|---|
| b | ≥0.762+0.083 −0.076 M_{J} | 0.1827±0.0078 | 30.337+0.006 −0.005 | 0.050+0.013 −0.049 | — | — |
