= List of stars in Ursa Major =

This is the list of notable stars in the constellation Ursa Major, sorted by decreasing brightness.

Name	B	F	Var	HD	HIP	RA	Dec	vis. mag.	abs. mag.	Dist. (ly)	Sp. class	Notes
Alioth	ε	77		112185	62956	12^{h} 54^{m} 01.63^{s}	+55° 57′ 35.4″	1.77	−0.21	81	A0p	Alioth; brown dwarf companion?; α^{2} CVn variable
Dubhe	α	50		95689	54061	11^{h} 03^{m} 43.84^{s}	+61° 45′ 04.0″	1.79	−1.08	124	K0III + F0V	Dubhe, Dubh, Dubb, Thahr al Dub al Akbar, Ak
Alkaid	η	85		120315	67301	13^{h} 47^{m} 32.55^{s}	+49° 18′ 47.9″	1.86	−0.60	101	B3V SB	Benetnasch, Alkaid, Elkeid
Mizar A	ζ^{1}	79		116656	65378	13^{h} 23^{m} 55.54^{s}	+54° 55′ 31.3″	2.23	0.32	83	A2V SB	spectroscopic binary, the Mizar pair also form a naked eye double with Alcor
Merak	β	48		95418	53910	11^{h} 01^{m} 50.39^{s}	+56° 22′ 56.4″	2.37	0.41	79	A1V	Merak, Mirak
Phecda	γ	64		103287	58001	11^{h} 53^{m} 49.74^{s}	+53° 41′ 41.0″	2.44	0.36	84	A0V SB	Phad, Phecda, Phegda, Phekha, Phacd
ψ UMa	ψ	52		96833	54539	11^{h} 09^{m} 39.86^{s}	+44° 29′ 54.8″	3.01	−0.27	147	K1III	Ta Tsun
μ UMa	μ	34		89758	50801	10^{h} 22^{m} 19.80^{s}	+41° 29′ 58.0″	3.06	−1.35	249	M0III SB	Tania Australis, Alkafzah Australis; semiregular variable
θ UMa	θ	25		82328	46853	09^{h} 32^{m} 52.33^{s}	+51° 40′ 43.0″	3.12	2.52	44	F6IV	Al Haud, Sarir, Sarir Bonet
ι UMa	ι	9		76644	44127	08^{h} 59^{m} 12.84^{s}	+48° 02′ 32.5″	3.14	2.29	48	A7IV	Talitha, Dnoces, Alphikra Borealis; quadruple star
Megrez	δ	69		106591	59774	12^{h} 15^{m} 25.45^{s}	+57° 01′ 57.4″	3.31	1.33	81	A3Vvar	Megrez, Kaffa
ο UMa	ο	1		71369	41704	08^{h} 30^{m} 16.03^{s}	+60° 43′ 06.4″	3.35	−0.40	184	G4II-III	Muscida, has a planet (b)
λ UMa	λ	33		89021	50372	10^{h} 17^{m} 05.93^{s}	+42° 54′ 52.1″	3.45	0.38	134	A2IV	Tania Borealis, Alkafzah Borealis
ν UMa	ν	54		98262	55219	11^{h} 18^{m} 28.76^{s}	+33° 05′ 39.3″	3.49	−2.07	421	K3III SB	Alula Borealis
κ UMa	κ	12		77327	44471	09^{h} 03^{m} 37.56^{s}	+47° 09′ 24.0″	3.56	−1.99	423	A1Vn	Alkaphrah, Al Kaprah, Talitha Australis, Alphikra Australis
23 UMa	h	23		81937	46733	09^{h} 31^{m} 31.57^{s}	+63° 03′ 42.5″	3.65	1.83	75	F0IV	
χ UMa	χ	63		102224	57399	11^{h} 46^{m} 03.13^{s}	+47° 46′ 45.6″	3.72	−0.20	196	K0III	Taiyangshou, Alkafzah, Alkaphrah, El Koprah
υ UMa	υ	29		84999	48319	09^{h} 50^{m} 59.69^{s}	+59° 02′ 20.8″	3.78	1.04	115	F0IV	δ Sct variable
Mizar B	ζ^{2}	79		116657	65378	13^{h} 23^{m} 56.33^{s}	+54° 55′ 18.56″	3.88	1.96	83	A3m	spectroscopic binary, the Mizar pair also form a naked eye double with Alcor
Alcor	g	80		116842	65477	13^{h} 25^{m} 13.54^{s}	+54° 59′ 16.7″	3.99	2.00	82	A5Vn	Saidak, Suha, Arundhati; naked-eye double star with Mizar
ξ UMa A	ξ	53		98230	55203	11^{h} 18^{m} 11.24^{s}	+31° 31′ 50.8″	4.26	4.18	27.3	G0V	Alula Australis; binary star; RS CVn variable
15 UMa	f	15		78209	44901	09^{h} 08^{m} 52.39^{s}	+51° 36′ 17.0″	4.46	2.13	96	Am	
26 UMa		26		82621	47006	09^{h} 34^{m} 49.49^{s}	+52° 03′ 05.6″	4.47	−0.10	267	A2V	
24 UMa	d	24	DK	82210	46977	09^{h} 34^{m} 28.97^{s}	+69° 49′ 48.6″	4.54	1.99	106	G4III-IV	DK UMa; RS CVn variable
φ UMa	φ	30		85235	48402	09^{h} 52^{m} 06.36^{s}	+54° 03′ 51.4″	4.60	−1.08	436	A3IV	
ω UMa	ω	45		94334	53295	10^{h} 53^{m} 58.71^{s}	+43° 11′ 24.1″	4.61	0.10	267	A1Vs	
π^{2} UMa	π^{2}	4		73108	42527	08^{h} 40^{m} 12.90^{s}	+64° 19′ 40.3″	4.62	0.15	252	K2III	has a planet (b)
τ UMa	τ	14		78362	45075	09^{h} 10^{m} 54.93^{s}	+63° 30′ 49.6″	4.66	1.81	122	Am	
83 UMa		83	IQ	119228	66738	13^{h} 40^{m} 44.29^{s}	+54° 40′ 54.0″	4.69	−1.50	549	M2IIIvar	IQ UMa
HD 91312				91312	51658	10^{h} 33^{m} 14.00^{s}	+40° 25′ 31.9″	4.72	2.04	112	A7IV	
ξ UMa B	ξ	53		98231		11^{h} 18^{m} 11.00^{s}	+31° 31′ 45.0″	4.73	5.16		G2V	component of the ξ UMa system
ρ UMa	ρ	8		76827	44390	09^{h} 02^{m} 32.73^{s}	+67° 37′ 46.5″	4.74	0.01	287	M3III	
55 UMa		55		98353	55266	11^{h} 19^{m} 07.94^{s}	+38° 11′ 08.6″	4.80	1.01	183	A2V	
σ^{2} UMa	σ^{2}	13		78154	45038	09^{h} 10^{m} 23.53^{s}	+67° 08′ 03.3″	4.80	3.25	67	F7IV-V	
36 UMa		36		90839	51459	10^{h} 30^{m} 37.76^{s}	+55° 58′ 50.2″	4.82	4.28	42	F8V	
18 UMa	e	18	DD	79439	45493	09^{h} 16^{m} 11.28^{s}	+54° 01′ 18.2″	4.83	2.00	118	A5V	DD UMa; δ Sct variable
78 UMa		78		113139	63503	13^{h} 00^{m} 43.59^{s}	+56° 21′ 58.8″	4.93	2.94	81	F2V	
ET UMa			ET	89822	50933	10^{h} 24^{m} 07.86^{s}	+65° 33′ 59.3″	4.94	0.12	301	A0sp...	α^{2} CVn variable
				92523	52425	10^{h} 43^{m} 04.04^{s}	+69° 04′ 34.5″	4.99	−0.57	426	K3III	
46 UMa		46		94600	53426	10^{h} 55^{m} 44.46^{s}	+33° 30′ 25.2″	5.03	0.64	245	K1III	
56 UMa		56		98839	55560	11^{h} 22^{m} 49.61^{s}	+43° 28′ 57.9″	5.03	−0.90	492	G8II	
47 UMa		47		95128	53721	10^{h} 59^{m} 28.22^{s}	+40° 25′ 48.4″	5.03	4.29	46	G0V	Chalawan, has three planets (b, c & d)
49 UMa		49		95310	53838	11^{h} 00^{m} 50.48^{s}	+39° 12′ 43.7″	5.06	−0.40	403	Am	
15 LMi		(15)		84737	48113	09^{h} 48^{m} 35.18^{s}	+46° 01′ 16.4″	5.08	3.75	60	G2V	
44 UMa		44		94247	53261	10^{h} 53^{m} 34.52^{s}	+54° 35′ 06.5″	5.11	−1.46	676	K3III	
38 UMa		38		92424	52353	10^{h} 41^{m} 56.78^{s}	+65° 42′ 59.3″	5.12	0.94	224	K2IIIvar	
σ^{1} UMa	σ^{1}	11		77800	44857	09^{h} 08^{m} 23.53^{s}	+66° 52′ 24.0″	5.14	−0.77	498	K5III	
27 UMa		27		83506	47654	09^{h} 42^{m} 57.24^{s}	+72° 15′ 09.7″	5.15	−0.51	442	K0III	
37 UMa		37		91480	51814	10^{h} 35^{m} 09.62^{s}	+57° 04′ 57.2″	5.16	3.05	86	F1V	
16 UMa	c	16		79028	45333	09^{h} 14^{m} 20.55^{s}	+61° 25′ 24.2″	5.18	3.72	64	F9V	
				92787	52469	10^{h} 43^{m} 33.12^{s}	+46° 12′ 14.5″	5.18	2.42	116	F5III	
44 Lyn		(44)	CS	84335	47965	09^{h} 46^{m} 31.66^{s}	+57° 07′ 40.8″	5.20	−1.07	556	M3III	
67 UMa		67	DP	104513	58684	12^{h} 02^{m} 07.06^{s}	+43° 02′ 43.7″	5.22	2.57	111	A7m	DP UMa; δ Sct variable
31 UMa		31	SY	85795	48682	09^{h} 55^{m} 43.01^{s}	+49° 49′ 11.3″	5.27	1.10	223	A3III	SY UMa
				102328	57477	11^{h} 46^{m} 55.61^{s}	+55° 37′ 41.8″	5.27	1.26	206	K3III	
17 UMa		17		79354	45455	09^{h} 15^{m} 49.81^{s}	+56° 44′ 29.3″	5.28	−1.32	681	K5III	
57 UMa		57		99787	56034	11^{h} 29^{m} 04.16^{s}	+39° 20′ 13.0″	5.30	1.26	209	A2V	
61 UMa		61		101501	56997	11^{h} 41^{m} 03.03^{s}	+34° 12′ 09.2″	5.31	5.41	31	G8Vvar	
55 Cam		(55)		67447	40215	08^{h} 12^{m} 48.79^{s}	+68° 28′ 26.6″	5.34	−2.22	1062	G8II	
74 UMa		74		108844	60978	12^{h} 29^{m} 57.40^{s}	+58° 24′ 19.9″	5.37	0.74	274	A5e...	
				117376	65728	13^{h} 28^{m} 27.18^{s}	+59° 56′ 44.5″	5.40	1.10	236	A1Vn	
41 Lyn		(41)		81688	46471	09^{h} 28^{m} 39.99^{s}	+45° 36′ 06.5″	5.41	0.68	288	K0III-IV	Intercrus, has a planet (b)
				100203	56290	11^{h} 32^{m} 20.76^{s}	+61° 04′ 57.9″	5.46	3.26	90	F6V	
82 UMa		82		119024	66634	13^{h} 39^{m} 30.58^{s}	+52° 55′ 15.9″	5.46	1.88	169	A3Vn	
2 UMa	A	2		72037	42080	08^{h} 34^{m} 36.19^{s}	+65° 08′ 43.0″	5.47	2.04	158	A2m	
				95212	53781	11^{h} 00^{m} 14.70^{s}	+45° 31′ 34.6″	5.47	−1.69	881	K5III	
				77601	44613	09^{h} 05^{m} 24.11^{s}	+48° 31′ 49.3″	5.48	0.34	348	F6II-III	
				86378	49005	09^{h} 59^{m} 51.72^{s}	+56° 48′ 42.8″	5.50	−0.47	510	K5III	
70 UMa		70		107465	60212	12^{h} 20^{m} 50.83^{s}	+57° 51′ 51.4″	5.54	−1.12	701	K5III	
				92095	52136	10^{h} 39^{m} 05.74^{s}	+53° 40′ 06.6″	5.55	−0.44	514	K3III	
59 UMa		59		101107	56770	11^{h} 38^{m} 20.69^{s}	+43° 37′ 31.8″	5.56	2.26	149	F2II-III	
6 UMa		6		75958	43903	08^{h} 56^{m} 37.49^{s}	+64° 36′ 14.5″	5.57	0.69	308	G6III	
42 UMa		42		93875	53064	10^{h} 51^{m} 23.76^{s}	+59° 19′ 12.9″	5.57	1.04	263	K2III	
				104438	58654	12^{h} 01^{m} 39.53^{s}	+36° 02′ 32.2″	5.59	0.36	362	K0III	
81 UMa		81		118214	66198	13^{h} 34^{m} 07.33^{s}	+55° 20′ 54.4″	5.60	0.95	306	A0V	
π^{1} UMa	π^{1}	3		72905	42438	08^{h} 39^{m} 11.74^{s}	+65° 01′ 14.5″	5.63	4.86	47	G1.5Vb	Muscida; BY Draconis variable
				100615	56510	11^{h} 35^{m} 04.90^{s}	+54° 47′ 07.4″	5.63	0.13	411	K0III	
				73017	42372	08^{h} 38^{m} 22.26^{s}	+53° 24′ 05.7″	5.66	1.32	241	G8IV	
43 UMa		43		93859	53043	10^{h} 51^{m} 11.08^{s}	+56° 34′ 56.1″	5.66	0.51	350	K2III	
73 UMa		73		108502	60795	12^{h} 27^{m} 35.13^{s}	+55° 42′ 45.9″	5.68	0.03	439	M2III	
84 UMa		84	CR	120198	67231	13^{h} 46^{m} 35.68^{s}	+54° 25′ 57.7″	5.68	1.00	282	B9p EuCr	CR UMa; α^{2} CVn variable
86 UMa		86		121409	67848	13^{h} 53^{m} 51.04^{s}	+53° 43′ 43.3″	5.70	0.03	444	A0V	
				87141	49363	10^{h} 04^{m} 36.35^{s}	+53° 53′ 30.2″	5.71	2.34	154	F5V	
CO UMa			CO	96813	54522	11^{h} 09^{m} 19.11^{s}	+36° 18′ 34.0″	5.71	0.39	379	M3.5III	
5 UMa	b	5		75486	43644	08^{h} 53^{m} 22.57^{s}	+61° 57′ 44.0″	5.72	1.01	285	F2III	
				83489	47594	09^{h} 42^{m} 14.93^{s}	+69° 14′ 15.7″	5.72	−0.11	479	G9III:	
57 Cam		(57)	OS	69148	40772	08^{h} 19^{m} 17.18^{s}	+62° 30′ 25.7″	5.73	−0.07	470	G8III	OS UMa, RS CVn variable
HD 89744				89744	50786	10^{h} 22^{m} 10.0^{s}	+41° 13′ 46″	5.74	2.78	130	F7V	has two planets (b and c)
47 LMi		(47)		94497	53377	10^{h} 54^{m} 58.22^{s}	+34° 02′ 05.7″	5.73	0.87	305	G7III:	
				99283	55797	11^{h} 25^{m} 57.18^{s}	+55° 51′ 01.2″	5.73	0.59	348	K0III	
62 UMa		62		101606	57029	11^{h} 41^{m} 34.50^{s}	+31° 44′ 45.5″	5.73	2.67	133	F4V	
				102713	57670	11^{h} 49^{m} 41.80^{s}	+34° 55′ 54.3″	5.73	1.52	227	F5IV	
				77309	44504	09^{h} 04^{m} 00.40^{s}	+54° 17′ 02.0″	5.74	0.67	336	A2V	
32 UMa		32		88983	50448	10^{h} 18^{m} 02.15^{s}	+65° 06′ 30.1″	5.74	1.32	249	A8III	
				92354	52338	10^{h} 41^{m} 48.31^{s}	+68° 26′ 36.8″	5.74	−0.53	586	K3III	
22 UMa		22		82189	47013	09^{h} 34^{m} 53.39^{s}	+72° 12′ 21.1″	5.77	2.28	163	F7V	
CG UMa			CG	80390	45915	09^{h} 21^{m} 43.30^{s}	+56° 41′ 57.3″	5.79	−0.03	477	M4IIIa	
39 UMa		39		92728	52478	10^{h} 43^{m} 43.32^{s}	+57° 11′ 57.6″	5.79	0.53	368	A0Vs	
				106884	59920	12^{h} 17^{m} 29.56^{s}	+53° 11′ 29.2″	5.80	0.46	382	K6III	
71 UMa		71		108135	60584	12^{h} 25^{m} 03.22^{s}	+56° 46′ 40.3″	5.82	−1.99	1190	M3III	
				99747	56035	11^{h} 29^{m} 04.70^{s}	+61° 46′ 40.0″	5.83	3.24	107	F5Vawvar	
66 UMa		66		103605	58181	11^{h} 55^{m} 58.41^{s}	+56° 35′ 54.8″	5.83	0.90	315	K1III	
HD 111456				111456	62512	12^{h} 48^{m} 39.34^{s}	+60° 19′ 11.6″	5.83	3.91	79	F5V	
				112486	63143	12^{h} 56^{m} 17.64^{s}	+54° 05′ 58.1″	5.84	1.37	256	A5m	
				85841	48893	09^{h} 58^{m} 22.91^{s}	+72° 52′ 46.6″	5.86	0.58	370	K3III:	
EN UMa			EN	89343	50685	10^{h} 21^{m} 03.43^{s}	+68° 44′ 51.8″	5.88	0.38	410	A7Vn	δ Sct variable
				97989	55086	11^{h} 16^{m} 41.93^{s}	+49° 28′ 34.6″	5.88	0.32	421	K0III:	
				111270	62402	12^{h} 47^{m} 18.93^{s}	+62° 46′ 52.1″	5.88	1.88	206	A9V	
				71088	41676	08^{h} 29^{m} 46.29^{s}	+67° 17′ 50.7″	5.89	0.92	322	G8III	
				96834	54537	11^{h} 09^{m} 38.55^{s}	+43° 12′ 27.9″	5.89	−0.31	566	M2III	
				73171	42452	08^{h} 39^{m} 17.65^{s}	+52° 42′ 42.1″	5.91	0.48	397	K1III:	
				94132	53257	10^{h} 53^{m} 31.38^{s}	+69° 51′ 14.6″	5.91	2.72	142	G9IV	
				78935	45461	09^{h} 15^{m} 52.75^{s}	+72° 56′ 47.3″	5.93	1.18	291	F0III	
58 UMa		58		99984	56148	11^{h} 30^{m} 31.17^{s}	+43° 10′ 23.0″	5.94	2.19	183	F4V	
VY UMa			VY	92839	52577	10^{h} 45^{m} 04.02^{s}	+67° 24′ 41.0″	5.95	−1.75	1132	C5II	
				104075	58460	11^{h} 59^{m} 17.54^{s}	+33° 10′ 01.3″	5.95	−0.62	671	K1III	
				79763	45590	09^{h} 17^{m} 31.17^{s}	+46° 49′ 01.9″	5.96	0.70	367	A1V	
				83126	47401	09^{h} 39^{m} 27.92^{s}	+67° 16′ 20.4″	5.96	−0.15	543	K5	
HD 85945				85945	48802	09^{h} 57^{m} 13.57^{s}	+57° 25′ 06.1″	5.97	0.19	466	G8III	
				120787	67485	13^{h} 49^{m} 45.43^{s}	+61° 29′ 22.4″	5.97	0.55	395	G3V	
				95129	53726	10^{h} 59^{m} 32.74^{s}	+36° 05′ 35.6″	5.99	−1.19	888	M2III	
				68951	40889	08^{h} 20^{m} 40.32^{s}	+72° 24′ 26.3″	6.00	−1.32	948	M0III	
				89319	50546	10^{h} 19^{m} 26.88^{s}	+48° 23′ 49.3″	6.00	2.82	141	K0	
				90470	51200	10^{h} 27^{m} 28.08^{s}	+41° 36′ 04.4″	6.00	1.89	216	A2V	
				89414	50635	10^{h} 20^{m} 31.18^{s}	+54° 13′ 00.7″	6.01	0.28	457	K3III:	
51 UMa		51		95934	54136	11^{h} 04^{m} 31.28^{s}	+38° 14′ 28.9″	6.01	1.48	263	A3III-IV	
				98772	55564	11^{h} 22^{m} 51.25^{s}	+64° 19′ 49.5″	6.02	1.34	282	A3V	
76 UMa		76		110462	61936	12^{h} 41^{m} 33.95^{s}	+62° 42′ 47.1″	6.02	−0.24	581	A2III	
				119765	67005	13^{h} 43^{m} 54.80^{s}	+52° 03′ 51.9″	6.02	0.90	345	A1V	
				94669	53465	10^{h} 56^{m} 14.51^{s}	+42° 00′ 30.2″	6.03	1.13	312	K2III	
				95241	53791	11^{h} 00^{m} 20.76^{s}	+42° 54′ 43.3″	6.03	2.74	148	F9V	
				90745	51448	10^{h} 30^{m} 26.65^{s}	+64° 15′ 28.1″	6.07	1.33	289	A7III	
EP UMa			EP	96707	54540	11^{h} 09^{m} 39.92^{s}	+67° 12′ 37.0″	6.07	0.88	355	F0sp...	α^{2} CVn variable
75 UMa		75		108861	60992	12^{h} 30^{m} 04.22^{s}	+58° 46′ 04.1″	6.07	0.48	428	G8III-IV	
60 UMa		60		101133	56789	11^{h} 38^{m} 33.54^{s}	+46° 50′ 03.4″	6.09	0.93	351	F5IIIs	
37 Lyn		(37)		80290	45836	09^{h} 20^{m} 43.79^{s}	+51° 15′ 56.6″	6.14	3.83	95	F3V	
				101013	56731	11^{h} 37^{m} 53.05^{s}	+50° 37′ 05.8″	6.14	0.39	461	K0p...	Barium star
				105043	58989	12^{h} 05^{m} 39.76^{s}	+62° 55′ 59.9″	6.14	0.85	373	K2III	
				113994	63952	13^{h} 06^{m} 22.86^{s}	+62° 02′ 31.1″	6.15	0.83	377	G7III	
				122866	68637	14^{h} 02^{m} 59.78^{s}	+50° 58′ 18.6″	6.16	1.25	313	A2V	
				83962	47791	09^{h} 44^{m} 36.62^{s}	+64° 59′ 02.6″	6.18	1.02	351	F3Vn	
U UMa			U	88651	50222	10^{h} 15^{m} 07.65^{s}	+59° 59′ 07.9″	6.18	−2.46	1743	M0IIIvar	
1 CVn		(1)		106478	59708	12^{h} 14^{m} 43.43^{s}	+53° 26′ 04.8″	6.18	0.23	505	K0III:	
				74604	43266	08^{h} 48^{m} 49.28^{s}	+66° 42′ 29.4″	6.20	0.21	514	B8V	
				98499	55412	11^{h} 20^{m} 53.71^{s}	+67° 06′ 03.1″	6.20	0.55	439	G8	
				108954	61053	12^{h} 30^{m} 50.12^{s}	+53° 04′ 34.2″	6.20	4.49	72	F9V	
				73971	42777	08^{h} 43^{m} 00.19^{s}	+46° 54′ 03.6″	6.21	0.70	412	G8III	
				95057	53706	10^{h} 59^{m} 17.89^{s}	+51° 52′ 56.5″	6.22	−0.38	681	K0	
				103736	58259	11^{h} 56^{m} 53.27^{s}	+61° 32′ 57.5″	6.22	−0.15	612	G8III	
EZ UMa			EZ	80953	46247	09^{h} 25^{m} 44.19^{s}	+63° 56′ 27.7″	6.24	−0.73	809	K2III	
				102942	57805	11^{h} 51^{m} 09.51^{s}	+33° 22′ 29.9″	6.25	2.25	205	Am	
				84812	48266	09^{h} 50^{m} 23.67^{s}	+65° 35′ 35.9″	6.27	1.41	306	A9Vn	
				101604	57045	11^{h} 41^{m} 43.52^{s}	+55° 10′ 19.2″	6.28	−1.17	1006	K5	
CQ UMa			CQ	119213	66700	13^{h} 40^{m} 21.44^{s}	+57° 12′ 27.2″	6.28	1.55	288	A4p SrCrEu	α^{2} CVn variable
				85583	48638	09^{h} 55^{m} 03.35^{s}	+61° 06′ 58.1″	6.29	0.91	389	K0	
				99859	56083	11^{h} 29^{m} 43.66^{s}	+56° 44′ 15.6″	6.29	2.13	221	A4m	
				101151	56784	11^{h} 38^{m} 32.33^{s}	+33° 37′ 33.1″	6.29	−0.16	634	K2III	
				101177	56809	11^{h} 38^{m} 45.39^{s}	+45° 06′ 30.2″	6.29	4.45	76	G0V	Binary star
				81025	46168	09^{h} 24^{m} 55.64^{s}	+51° 34′ 26.1″	6.30	0.69	432	G2III	
EE UMa			EE	99967	56135	11^{h} 30^{m} 24.83^{s}	+46° 39′ 26.9″	6.30	−1.10	985	K2IIICN-1	
				71553	41927	08^{h} 32^{m} 53.27^{s}	+69° 19′ 11.9″	6.31	−0.08	619	K0	
				87243	49408	10^{h} 05^{m} 10.40^{s}	+52° 22′ 16.7″	6.31	1.28	330	A5IV	
HD 119124				119124	66704	13^{h} 40^{m} 23.35^{s}	+50° 31′ 09.4″	6.31	4.30	82	F7.7V	
35 UMa		35		90633	51401	10^{h} 29^{m} 54.43^{s}	+65° 37′ 34.7″	6.32	1.41	313	K2III:	
				97501	54842	11^{h} 13^{m} 40.10^{s}	+41° 05′ 19.7″	6.33	1.29	332	K2III	
				99373	55821	11^{h} 26^{m} 25.58^{s}	+33° 27′ 02.0″	6.33	2.53	188	F6IV	
				73131	42415	08^{h} 38^{m} 59.92^{s}	+52° 55′ 30.5″	6.34	0.08	581	K0	
				86166	48861	09^{h} 57^{m} 56.84^{s}	+45° 24′ 51.8″	6.34	0.80	418	K0III	
41 UMa		41		93132	52685	10^{h} 46^{m} 22.54^{s}	+57° 21′ 57.8″	6.34	−0.49	756	M1III	
68 UMa		68		106002	59458	12^{h} 11^{m} 44.89^{s}	+57° 03′ 16.0″	6.34	−1.03	970	K5III	
				117242	65678	13^{h} 27^{m} 59.73^{s}	+52° 44′ 44.3″	6.34	1.35	325	F0	
				75487	43624	08^{h} 53^{m} 05.93^{s}	+59° 03′ 22.1″	6.35	2.40	201	F5IV-V	
				101391	56944	11^{h} 40^{m} 27.44^{s}	+57° 58′ 13.3″	6.35	0.31	526	B9p...	
				83869	47633	09^{h} 42^{m} 43.12^{s}	+48° 25′ 51.8″	6.36	0.73	435	A1V	
				90602	51290	10^{h} 28^{m} 36.54^{s}	+45° 12′ 44.1″	6.37	−0.48	763	K0	
				95256	53860	11^{h} 01^{m} 05.73^{s}	+63° 25′ 16.4″	6.38	1.68	284	A2m	
				100470	56410	11^{h} 33^{m} 56.38^{s}	+36° 48′ 56.7″	6.38	0.81	424	K0III	
				110678	62046	12^{h} 43^{m} 04.19^{s}	+61° 09′ 19.3″	6.39	0.56	477	K0	
				80461	45888	09^{h} 21^{m} 23.61^{s}	+45° 22′ 12.5″	6.40	−0.30	713	K0	
				93427	52877	10^{h} 48^{m} 49.86^{s}	+65° 07′ 56.9″	6.40	0.85	420	A1V	
				97138	54721	11^{h} 12^{m} 10.90^{s}	+68° 16′ 18.7″	6.40	1.58	300	A3V	
				100030	56170	11^{h} 30^{m} 53.14^{s}	+47° 55′ 44.8″	6.40	1.38	328	G9IV	
				82969	47231	09^{h} 37^{m} 37.52^{s}	+60° 12′ 49.5″	6.41	1.45	321	G5	
				95233	53798	11^{h} 00^{m} 25.58^{s}	+51° 30′ 07.7″	6.41	0.20	568	G9III	
				97334	54745	11^{h} 12^{m} 32.53^{s}	+35° 48′ 52.0″	6.41	4.73	71	G0V	
				69976	41060	08^{h} 22^{m} 44.06^{s}	+60° 37′ 52.5″	6.42	0.75	444	K0III	
				89268	50509	10^{h} 18^{m} 58.77^{s}	+46° 45′ 39.1″	6.42	−0.61	830	K1III	
				90508	51248	10^{h} 28^{m} 03.81^{s}	+48° 47′ 13.4″	6.42	4.56	77	G1V	
				93551	52929	10^{h} 49^{m} 28.82^{s}	+63° 48′ 36.0″	6.42	−0.69	862	K0	
Groombridge 1830				103095	57939	11^{h} 52^{m} 55.82^{s}	+37° 43′ 58.1″	6.42	6.61	30	G8VIp	Argelander's Star
				103928	58369	11^{h} 58^{m} 07.25^{s}	+32° 16′ 26.6″	6.42	3.04	155	A9V	
56 Cam		(56)		68457	40474	08^{h} 15^{m} 50.52^{s}	+60° 22′ 50.1″	6.43	0.50	499	A7Vm	
				98673	55485	11^{h} 21^{m} 49.35^{s}	+57° 04′ 29.4″	6.43	1.96	255	A7Vn	
				77692	44717	09^{h} 06^{m} 43.16^{s}	+59° 20′ 40.4″	6.44	−1.26	1132	A2V	
				94084	53157	10^{h} 52^{m} 32.11^{s}	+52° 30′ 13.4″	6.44	1.51	315	K2III	
				95572	54038	11^{h} 03^{m} 27.37^{s}	+70° 01′ 51.0″	6.44	−0.32	734	K0	
				89389	50606	10^{h} 20^{m} 14.88^{s}	+53° 46′ 45.4″	6.45	4.02	100	F9V	
				120874	67548	13^{h} 50^{m} 27.77^{s}	+58° 32′ 21.9″	6.45	1.87	269	A3V	
				73029	42434	08^{h} 39^{m} 10.10^{s}	+59° 56′ 21.3″	6.47	1.25	360	A2Vn	
				103500	58119	11^{h} 55^{m} 14.10^{s}	+36° 45′ 23.4″	6.47	0.19	588	M3III	
				119992	67103	13^{h} 45^{m} 13.10^{s}	+55° 52′ 48.8″	6.47	3.84	110	F7IV-V	
				123977	69107	14^{h} 08^{m} 46.19^{s}	+59° 20′ 15.7″	6.47	0.83	438	K0III	
				89221	50485	10^{h} 18^{m} 32.91^{s}	+43° 02′ 55.1″	6.48	3.72	116	G5	
				118536	66385	13^{h} 36^{m} 39.89^{s}	+49° 29′ 12.1″	6.48	0.55	500	K1III	
				82408	46879	09^{h} 33^{m} 11.26^{s}	+45° 30′ 49.9″	6.49	0.22	584	K0	
				101150	56816	11^{h} 38^{m} 49.12^{s}	+64° 20′ 49.1″	6.49	0.02	640	A5IV	
				104179	58512	11^{h} 59^{m} 57.41^{s}	+34° 02′ 04.8″	6.49	1.19	374	A9III	
				118970	66613	13^{h} 39^{m} 14.92^{s}	+51° 48′ 15.1″	6.49	−1.82	1495	K2	
HR 5256				122064	68184	13^{h} 57^{m} 32.10^{s}	+61° 29′ 32.4″	6.49	6.47	33	K3V	
				81790	46566	09^{h} 29^{m} 47.87^{s}	+55° 44′ 43.2″	6.50	3.27	145	F3Vs	
				83564	47521	09^{h} 41^{m} 16.76^{s}	+55° 51′ 59.7″	6.50	0.99	412	K1III-IV	
				83886	47664	09^{h} 43^{m} 07.00^{s}	+54° 21′ 49.6″	6.50	1.69	299	A5m	
				113436	63647	13^{h} 02^{m} 40.46^{s}	+59° 42′ 58.8″	6.50	0.12	615	A3Vn	
				117043	65530	13^{h} 26^{m} 00.37^{s}	+63° 15′ 38.7″	6.50	4.85	70	G6V	
28 UMa		28		84179	47911	09^{h} 45^{m} 55.38^{s}	+63° 39′ 12.3″	6.51	2.07	252	F2V	
65 UMa		65		103483	58112	11^{h} 55^{m} 05.74^{s}	+46° 28′ 36.6″	6.54	−0.41	801	A3Vn	
25 LMi		(25)		89572	50687	10^{h} 21^{m} 03.67^{s}	+41° 50′ 57.8″	6.78	0.17	685	A0	
14 LMi		(14)		84453	47973	09^{h} 46^{m} 42.44^{s}	+45° 06′ 53.0″	6.81	2.22	270	K0IV	
39 Lyn		(39)		80608	45974	09^{h} 22^{m} 32.20^{s}	+49° 32′ 41.4″	6.9	0.1	738	B9	
HD 84406				84406	48034	09^{h} 47^{m} 30.55^{s}	+63° 14′ 52.1″	6.94	2.55	258.5	G8IV	
65 UMa		65		103498	58117	11^{h} 55^{m} 11.32^{s}	+46° 28′ 11.2″	7.03	−0.46	1025	A1spe...	
72 UMa		72		108346	60712	12^{h} 26^{m} 32.60^{s}	+55° 09′ 33.9″	7.03	1.22	472	Am	
40 UMa		40		93075	52650	10^{h} 45^{m} 59.86^{s}	+56° 55′ 14.9″	7.11	1.88	363	A8V	
HD 96127				96127	54232	11^{h} 05^{m} 46^{s}	+44° 18′ 06″	7.43	-1.23	1761	K2III	has a planet (b)
Lalande 21185				95735	54035	11^{h} 03^{m} 20.19^{s}	+35° 58′ 11.5″	7.49	10.46	8.29	M2V	Argelander's Second Star; 4th-closest star system; has 2 planets
HD 116798				116798		13^{h} 24^{m} 52^{s}	+54° 53′ 51″	7.59	2.18	299	A5	Sidus Ludoviciana
HD 79211				79211		09^{h} 14^{m} 22.79157^{s}	52° 41′ 11.7206″	7.64	8.71	20.09	M0.0	a binary system with a super-Earth planet detected by radial velocity
HD 99706				99706	55994	11^{h} 28^{m} 30^{s}	+43° 58′ 00 ″	7.81	2.26	421	K0	has a planet (b)
W UMa			W	83950	47727	09^{h} 43^{m} 45.47^{s}	+55° 57′ 09.1″	7.96	4.48	162	F8Vp+...	prototype of W UMa variables
HD 102956				102956	57820	11^{h} 51^{m} 23^{s}	+57° 38′ 27″	8.00	2.5	411	A	Aniara; has a planet (b)
HD 118203				118203	66192	13^{h} 34^{m} 02.54^{s}	+53° 43′ 42.7″	8.07	3.33	289	K0	Liesma; has a planet (b)
T UMa			T	109729	61532	12^{h} 36^{m} 23.47^{s}	+59° 29′ 13.0″	8.11	−3.19	5930	M4IIIe	Mira-type variable star
HD 95127				95127	53733	10^{h} 59^{m} 35.0^{s}	+43° 48′ 52″	8.15	0.77	978	K0	has a planet (b)
HD 68988				68988	40687	08^{h} 18^{m} 22.17^{s}	+61° 27′ 38.6″	8.21	4.36	192	G0	Násti; has two planets (b & c)
R UMa			R	92763	52546	10^{h} 44^{m} 38.47^{s}	+68° 46′ 32.7″	8.41	0.95	1013	M4e	Mira-type variable star
HD 80606				80606	45982	09^{h} 22^{m} 37.57^{s}	+50° 36′ 13.4″	8.93	5.10	190	G5	has a transiting planet (b)
HIP 57274					57274	11^{h} 44^{m} 41^{s}	+30° 57′ 33 ″	8.96	6.88	85	K5V	have three planets (b, c and d)
Winnecke 4						12^{h} 22^{m} 12.5^{s}	+58° 04′ 59″	9.0	3.0	510	K0III	Messier 40; optical double star
SZ UMa			SZ		55360	11^{h} 20^{m} 04.83^{s}	+65° 50′ 47.4″	9.32	9.52	30	M0	variable star
HAT-P-22				233731		10^{h} 22^{m} 44^{s}	+50° 07′ 42″	9.73		267	G5	has a transiting planet (b)
HD 233604				233604		09^{h} 09^{m} 49.0^{s}	+53° 34′ 05″	10.41			K5	has a planet (b)
HAT-P-13						08^{h} 39^{m} 31.81^{s}	+47° 21′ 07.3″	10.62	3.97	698	G4	has a transiting planet (b), a brown dwarf (c) and one unconfirmed planet (d)
AA UMa			AA			09^{h} 46^{m} 59.28^{s}	+45° 45′ 56.39″	11.16			G0	eclipsing binary system
HAT-P-21						11^{h} 25^{m} 06^{s}	+41° 01′ 41″	11.46	4.44	828	G3	Mazaalai; has a transiting planet (b)
GSC 03466-00819						13^{h} 44^{m} 22.58^{s}	+48° 01′ 43.2″	11.86	6.13	457	K	Dombay; has a transiting planet HAT-P-3b
HIP 57050					57050	11^{h} 41^{m} 44.63^{s}	+42° 45′ 07.1″	11.88	11.66	36	M4V	has a planet (b)
CF UMa			CF			11^{h} 52^{m} 58.8^{s}	+37° 43′ 07″	12.00			M5.5V	flare star
HAT-P-66						10^{h} 02^{m} 17.5^{s}	+53° 57′ 03″	13	3.16	3023		has a transiting planet HAT-P-66b
WX UMa			WX			11^{h} 05^{m} 31.33^{s}	+43° 31′ 17.1″	14.45	16.03	16	M6	flare star
Table legend: • Name = Proper name • B = Bayer designation • F or/and G. = Flamsteed designation or Gould designation • Var = Variable-star designation • HD = Henry Draper Catalogue designation number • HIP = Hipparcos Catalogue designation number • RA = Right ascension for the Epoch/Equinox J2000.0 • Dec = Declination for the Epoch/Equinox J2000.0 • vis. mag. = visual magnitude (m or m_{v}), also known as apparent magnitude • abs. mag. = absolute magnitude (M_{v}) • Dist. (ly) = Distance in light-years from Earth • Sp. class = Spectral class of the star in the stellar classification system • Notes = Common name(s) or alternate name(s); comments; notable properties [for example: multiple star status, range of variability if it is a variable star, exoplanets, etc.]

== See also ==
- List of stars by constellation
