= Ursa Major in Chinese astronomy =

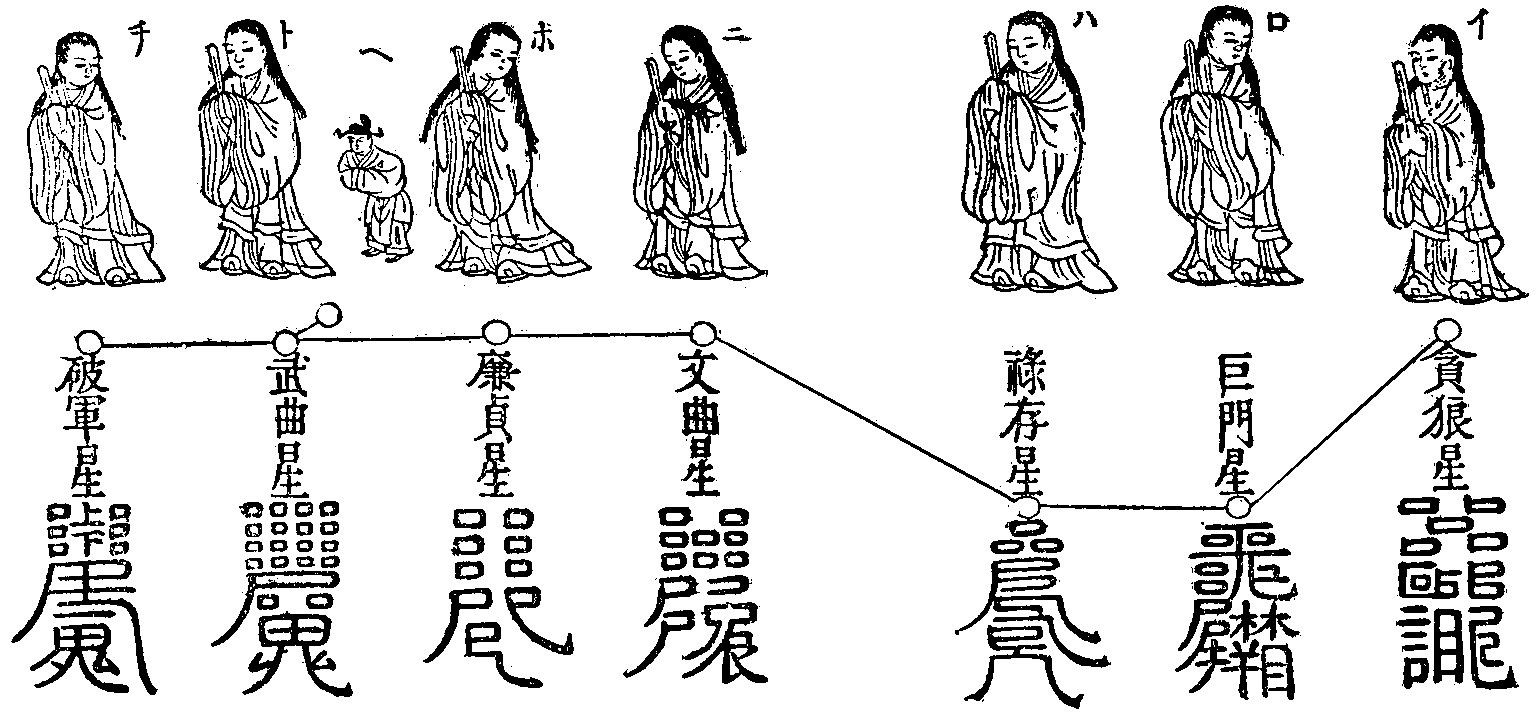
Illustration of the Big Dipper deities from Sutra on Prolonging Life through Worship of the Seven Stars of the Big Dipper, Preached by the Buddha (佛說北斗七星延命經; Foshuo beidou qixing yanming jing) From right to left: Tanlang Star, Jumen Star, Lucun Star, Wenqu Star, Lianzhen Start, Fu Star, Wuqu Star, and Pojun Star.

According to traditional Chinese uranography, the modern constellation Ursa Major is located in the constellation called the Three Enclosures (三垣, Sān Yuán).

The name of the western constellation in modern Chinese is 大熊座 (dà xióng zuò), meaning "the big bear constellation".

== Stars ==
The map of Chinese constellation in constellation Ursa Major area consists of :

Enclosures	Enclosure (Chinese name)	Romanization	Translation	Asterisms (Chinese name)	Romanization	Translation	Western star name	Proper Name	Chinese star name	Romanization	Translation
Three Enclosures (三垣)	紫微垣	Zǐ Wēi Yuán	Purple Forbidden enclosure	紫微左垣	Zǐwēiyòuyuán	Right Wall					
Three Enclosures (三垣)	紫微垣	Zǐ Wēi Yuán	Purple Forbidden enclosure	紫微左垣	Zǐwēiyòuyuán	Right Wall	24 UMa				
Three Enclosures (三垣)	紫微垣	Zǐ Wēi Yuán	Purple Forbidden enclosure	紫微左垣	Zǐwēiyòuyuán	Right Wall	24 UMa		紫微右垣四	Zǐwēiyòuyuánsì	4th star
Three Enclosures (三垣)	紫微垣	Zǐ Wēi Yuán	Purple Forbidden enclosure	紫微左垣	Zǐwēiyòuyuán	Right Wall	24 UMa		少辅	Shǎofǔ	The Second Minister
Three Enclosures (三垣)	紫微垣	Zǐ Wēi Yuán	Purple Forbidden enclosure	紫微左垣	Zǐwēiyòuyuán	Right Wall	27 UMa		少辅增一	Shǎofǔzēngyī	1st additional star of The Second Minister
Three Enclosures (三垣)	紫微垣	Zǐ Wēi Yuán	Purple Forbidden enclosure	內階	Nèijiē	Inner Steps					
Three Enclosures (三垣)	紫微垣	Zǐ Wēi Yuán	Purple Forbidden enclosure	內階	Nèijiē	Inner Steps	ο UMa	Muscida	內階一	Nèijiēyī	1st star
Three Enclosures (三垣)	紫微垣	Zǐ Wēi Yuán	Purple Forbidden enclosure	內階	Nèijiē	Inner Steps	16 UMa		內階二	Nèijiēèr	2nd star
Three Enclosures (三垣)	紫微垣	Zǐ Wēi Yuán	Purple Forbidden enclosure	內階	Nèijiē	Inner Steps	6 UMa		內階三	Nèijiēsān	3rd star
Three Enclosures (三垣)	紫微垣	Zǐ Wēi Yuán	Purple Forbidden enclosure	內階	Nèijiē	Inner Steps	23 UMa		內階四	Nèijiēsì	4th star
Three Enclosures (三垣)	紫微垣	Zǐ Wēi Yuán	Purple Forbidden enclosure	內階	Nèijiē	Inner Steps	5 UMa		內階五	Nèijiēwǔ	5th star
Three Enclosures (三垣)	紫微垣	Zǐ Wēi Yuán	Purple Forbidden enclosure	內階	Nèijiē	Inner Steps	17 UMa		內階六	Nèijiēliù	6th star
Three Enclosures (三垣)	紫微垣	Zǐ Wēi Yuán	Purple Forbidden enclosure	內階	Nèijiē	Inner Steps	π^{2} UMa		內階增七	Nèijiēzēngqī	7th additional star
Three Enclosures (三垣)	紫微垣	Zǐ Wēi Yuán	Purple Forbidden enclosure	內階	Nèijiē	Inner Steps	2 UMa		內階增八	Nèijiēzēngbā	8th additional star
Three Enclosures (三垣)	紫微垣	Zǐ Wēi Yuán	Purple Forbidden enclosure	內階	Nèijiē	Inner Steps	π^{1} UMa		內階增九	Nèijiēzēngjiǔ	9th additional star
Three Enclosures (三垣)	紫微垣	Zǐ Wēi Yuán	Purple Forbidden enclosure	內階	Nèijiē	Inner Steps	τ UMa		內階增十	Nèijiēzēngshí	10th additional star
Three Enclosures (三垣)	紫微垣	Zǐ Wēi Yuán	Purple Forbidden enclosure	內廚	Nèichú	Inner Kitchen	76 UMa		內廚增二	Nèichúzēngèr	2nd star
Three Enclosures (三垣)	紫微垣	Zǐ Wēi Yuán	Purple Forbidden enclosure	文昌	Wénchāng	Administrative Center					
Three Enclosures (三垣)	紫微垣	Zǐ Wēi Yuán	Purple Forbidden enclosure	文昌	Wénchāng	Administrative Center	υ UMa		文昌一	Wénchānyī	1st star
Three Enclosures (三垣)	紫微垣	Zǐ Wēi Yuán	Purple Forbidden enclosure	文昌	Wénchāng	Administrative Center	φ UMa		文昌三	Wénchāngsān	3rd star
Three Enclosures (三垣)	紫微垣	Zǐ Wēi Yuán	Purple Forbidden enclosure	文昌	Wénchāng	Administrative Center	θ UMa		文昌四	Wénchāngsì	4th star
Three Enclosures (三垣)	紫微垣	Zǐ Wēi Yuán	Purple Forbidden enclosure	文昌	Wénchāng	Administrative Center	15 UMa		文昌五	Wénchāngwǔ	5th star
Three Enclosures (三垣)	紫微垣	Zǐ Wēi Yuán	Purple Forbidden enclosure	文昌	Wénchāng	Administrative Center	18 UMa		文昌六	Wénchāngliù	6th star
Three Enclosures (三垣)	紫微垣	Zǐ Wēi Yuán	Purple Forbidden enclosure	文昌	Wénchāng	Administrative Center	28 UMa		文昌增一	Wénchāngzēngyī	1st additional star
Three Enclosures (三垣)	紫微垣	Zǐ Wēi Yuán	Purple Forbidden enclosure	文昌	Wénchāng	Administrative Center	HD 84335		文昌增二	Wénchāngzēngèr	2nd additional star
Three Enclosures (三垣)	紫微垣	Zǐ Wēi Yuán	Purple Forbidden enclosure	文昌	Wénchāng	Administrative Center	21 UMa		文昌增三	Wénchāngzēngsān	3rd additional star
Three Enclosures (三垣)	紫微垣	Zǐ Wēi Yuán	Purple Forbidden enclosure	文昌	Wénchāng	Administrative Center	26 UMa		文昌增四	Wénchāngzēngsì	4th additional star
Three Enclosures (三垣)	紫微垣	Zǐ Wēi Yuán	Purple Forbidden enclosure	文昌	Wénchāng	Administrative Center	37 Lyn		文昌增五	Wénchāngzēngwǔ	5th additional star
Three Enclosures (三垣)	紫微垣	Zǐ Wēi Yuán	Purple Forbidden enclosure	文昌	Wénchāng	Administrative Center	HD 80608		文昌增六	Wénchāngzēngliù	6th additional star
Three Enclosures (三垣)	紫微垣	Zǐ Wēi Yuán	Purple Forbidden enclosure	文昌	Wénchāng	Administrative Center	31 UMa		文昌增七	Wénchāngzēngqī	7th additional star
Three Enclosures (三垣)	紫微垣	Zǐ Wēi Yuán	Purple Forbidden enclosure	三師	Sānshī	Three Top Instructors					
Three Enclosures (三垣)	紫微垣	Zǐ Wēi Yuán	Purple Forbidden enclosure	三師	Sānshī	Three Top Instructors	ρ UMa		三師一	Sānshīyī	1st star
Three Enclosures (三垣)	紫微垣	Zǐ Wēi Yuán	Purple Forbidden enclosure	三師	Sānshī	Three Top Instructors	σ^{2} UMa		三師三	Sānshīsān	3rd star
Three Enclosures (三垣)	紫微垣	Zǐ Wēi Yuán	Purple Forbidden enclosure	三師	Sānshī	Three Top Instructors	σ^{1} UMa		三師增一	Sānshīzēngyī	1st additional star
Three Enclosures (三垣)	紫微垣	Zǐ Wēi Yuán	Purple Forbidden enclosure	太尊	Tàizūn	Royal	ψ UMa		太尊	Tàizūn	(One star of)
Three Enclosures (三垣)	紫微垣	Zǐ Wēi Yuán	Purple Forbidden enclosure	天牢	Tiānláo	Celestial Prison					
Three Enclosures (三垣)	紫微垣	Zǐ Wēi Yuán	Purple Forbidden enclosure	天牢	Tiānláo	Celestial Prison	ω UMa		天牢一	Tiānláoyī	1st star
Three Enclosures (三垣)	紫微垣	Zǐ Wēi Yuán	Purple Forbidden enclosure	天牢	Tiānláo	Celestial Prison	57 UMa		天牢二	Tiānláoèr	2nd star
Three Enclosures (三垣)	紫微垣	Zǐ Wēi Yuán	Purple Forbidden enclosure	天牢	Tiānláo	Celestial Prison	47 UMa	Chalawan	天牢三	Tiānláosān	3rd star
Three Enclosures (三垣)	紫微垣	Zǐ Wēi Yuán	Purple Forbidden enclosure	天牢	Tiānláo	Celestial Prison	58 UMa		天牢四	Tiānláosì	4th star
Three Enclosures (三垣)	紫微垣	Zǐ Wēi Yuán	Purple Forbidden enclosure	天牢	Tiānláo	Celestial Prison	49 UMa		天牢五	Tiānláowǔ	5th star
Three Enclosures (三垣)	紫微垣	Zǐ Wēi Yuán	Purple Forbidden enclosure	天牢	Tiānláo	Celestial Prison	56 UMa		天牢六	Tiānláoliù	6th star
Three Enclosures (三垣)	紫微垣	Zǐ Wēi Yuán	Purple Forbidden enclosure	天牢	Tiānláo	Celestial Prison	59 UMa		天牢增一	Tiānláozēngyī	1st additional star
Three Enclosures (三垣)	紫微垣	Zǐ Wēi Yuán	Purple Forbidden enclosure	天牢	Tiānláo	Celestial Prison	55 UMa		天牢增二	Tiānláozēngèr	2nd additional star
Three Enclosures (三垣)	紫微垣	Zǐ Wēi Yuán	Purple Forbidden enclosure	太陽守	Tàiyángshǒu	Guard of the Sun					
Three Enclosures (三垣)	紫微垣	Zǐ Wēi Yuán	Purple Forbidden enclosure	太陽守	Tàiyángshǒu	Guard of the Sun	χ UMa	Taiyangshou	太陽守	Tàiyángshǒu	(One star of)
Three Enclosures (三垣)	紫微垣	Zǐ Wēi Yuán	Purple Forbidden enclosure	太陽守	Tàiyángshǒu	Guard of the Sun	60 UMa		太陽守增一	Tàiyángshǒuzēngyī	1st additional star
Three Enclosures (三垣)	紫微垣	Zǐ Wēi Yuán	Purple Forbidden enclosure	势	Shì	Eunuch					
Three Enclosures (三垣)	紫微垣	Zǐ Wēi Yuán	Purple Forbidden enclosure	势	Shì	Eunuch	47 LMi		势增十二	Shìzēngshíèr	12th additional star
Three Enclosures (三垣)	紫微垣	Zǐ Wēi Yuán	Purple Forbidden enclosure	势	Shì	Eunuch	46 UMa		势增十三	Shìzēngshísān	13th additional star
Three Enclosures (三垣)	紫微垣	Zǐ Wēi Yuán	Purple Forbidden enclosure	相	Xiāng	Prime Minister	1 CVn		相增一	Xiāngzēngyī	1st additional star
Three Enclosures (三垣)	紫微垣	Zǐ Wēi Yuán	Purple Forbidden enclosure	天理	Tiānlǐ	Judge for Nobility					
Three Enclosures (三垣)	紫微垣	Zǐ Wēi Yuán	Purple Forbidden enclosure	天理	Tiānlǐ	Judge for Nobility	HD 97889		天理一	Tiānlǐyī	1st star
Three Enclosures (三垣)	紫微垣	Zǐ Wēi Yuán	Purple Forbidden enclosure	天理	Tiānlǐ	Judge for Nobility	HD 99283		天理二	Tiānlǐèr	2nd star
Three Enclosures (三垣)	紫微垣	Zǐ Wēi Yuán	Purple Forbidden enclosure	天理	Tiānlǐ	Judge for Nobility	66 UMa		天理三	Tiānlǐsān	3rd star
Three Enclosures (三垣)	紫微垣	Zǐ Wēi Yuán	Purple Forbidden enclosure	天理	Tiānlǐ	Judge for Nobility	HD 103736		天理四	Tiānlǐsì	4th star
Three Enclosures (三垣)	紫微垣	Zǐ Wēi Yuán	Purple Forbidden enclosure	天理	Tiānlǐ	Judge for Nobility	HD 99747		天理增一	Tiānlǐzēngyī	1st additional star
Three Enclosures (三垣)	紫微垣	Zǐ Wēi Yuán	Purple Forbidden enclosure	北斗	Běidǒu	Northern Dipper					
Three Enclosures (三垣)	紫微垣	Zǐ Wēi Yuán	Purple Forbidden enclosure	北斗	Běidǒu	Northern Dipper	α UMa	Dubhe (for component A)			
Three Enclosures (三垣)	紫微垣	Zǐ Wēi Yuán	Purple Forbidden enclosure	北斗	Běidǒu	Northern Dipper	α UMa	Dubhe (for component A)	北斗一	Běidǒuyī	1st star
Three Enclosures (三垣)	紫微垣	Zǐ Wēi Yuán	Purple Forbidden enclosure	北斗	Běidǒu	Northern Dipper	α UMa	Dubhe (for component A)	天樞	Tiānshū	The Celestial Pivot
Three Enclosures (三垣)	紫微垣	Zǐ Wēi Yuán	Purple Forbidden enclosure	北斗	Běidǒu	Northern Dipper	α UMa	Dubhe (for component A)	紐星	Niǔxīng	Turning star
Three Enclosures (三垣)	紫微垣	Zǐ Wēi Yuán	Purple Forbidden enclosure	北斗	Běidǒu	Northern Dipper	α UMa	Dubhe (for component A)	天魁	Tiānkuí	Celestial chief
Three Enclosures (三垣)	紫微垣	Zǐ Wēi Yuán	Purple Forbidden enclosure	北斗	Běidǒu	Northern Dipper	α UMa	Dubhe (for component A)	贪狼	Tānláng	Greedy wolf
Three Enclosures (三垣)	紫微垣	Zǐ Wēi Yuán	Purple Forbidden enclosure	北斗	Běidǒu	Northern Dipper	α UMa	Dubhe (for component A)	枢星	Shūxīng	Pivot star
Three Enclosures (三垣)	紫微垣	Zǐ Wēi Yuán	Purple Forbidden enclosure	北斗	Běidǒu	Northern Dipper	α UMa	Dubhe (for component A)	天蓬	Tiānpéng	Celestial fleabane
Three Enclosures (三垣)	紫微垣	Zǐ Wēi Yuán	Purple Forbidden enclosure	北斗	Běidǒu	Northern Dipper	α UMa	Dubhe (for component A)	生气	Shēngqì	Angry
Three Enclosures (三垣)	紫微垣	Zǐ Wēi Yuán	Purple Forbidden enclosure	北斗	Běidǒu	Northern Dipper	β UMa	Merak			
Three Enclosures (三垣)	紫微垣	Zǐ Wēi Yuán	Purple Forbidden enclosure	北斗	Běidǒu	Northern Dipper	β UMa	Merak	北斗二	Běidǒuèr	2nd star
Three Enclosures (三垣)	紫微垣	Zǐ Wēi Yuán	Purple Forbidden enclosure	北斗	Běidǒu	Northern Dipper	β UMa	Merak	天璇	Tiānxuán	The Celestial Rotating Jade
Three Enclosures (三垣)	紫微垣	Zǐ Wēi Yuán	Purple Forbidden enclosure	北斗	Běidǒu	Northern Dipper	β UMa	Merak	从魁	Cōngkuí	Passing-through chief
Three Enclosures (三垣)	紫微垣	Zǐ Wēi Yuán	Purple Forbidden enclosure	北斗	Běidǒu	Northern Dipper	β UMa	Merak	巨门	Jùmén	Huge gate
Three Enclosures (三垣)	紫微垣	Zǐ Wēi Yuán	Purple Forbidden enclosure	北斗	Běidǒu	Northern Dipper	β UMa	Merak	法星	Fǎxīng	Star of law
Three Enclosures (三垣)	紫微垣	Zǐ Wēi Yuán	Purple Forbidden enclosure	北斗	Běidǒu	Northern Dipper	β UMa	Merak	枢星	Xuánxīng	Whirling star
Three Enclosures (三垣)	紫微垣	Zǐ Wēi Yuán	Purple Forbidden enclosure	北斗	Běidǒu	Northern Dipper	β UMa	Merak	天醫	Tiānyī	Celestial medicine
Three Enclosures (三垣)	紫微垣	Zǐ Wēi Yuán	Purple Forbidden enclosure	北斗	Běidǒu	Northern Dipper	γ UMa	Phecda (for component A)			
Three Enclosures (三垣)	紫微垣	Zǐ Wēi Yuán	Purple Forbidden enclosure	北斗	Běidǒu	Northern Dipper	γ UMa	Phecda (for component A)	北斗三	Běidǒusān	3rd star
Three Enclosures (三垣)	紫微垣	Zǐ Wēi Yuán	Purple Forbidden enclosure	北斗	Běidǒu	Northern Dipper	γ UMa	Phecda (for component A)	天璣	Tiānjī	The Celestial Shining Pearl
Three Enclosures (三垣)	紫微垣	Zǐ Wēi Yuán	Purple Forbidden enclosure	北斗	Běidǒu	Northern Dipper	γ UMa	Phecda (for component A)	禄存	Lùcún	Standing-official salary
Three Enclosures (三垣)	紫微垣	Zǐ Wēi Yuán	Purple Forbidden enclosure	北斗	Běidǒu	Northern Dipper	γ UMa	Phecda (for component A)	令星	Lìngxīng	Star of commander
Three Enclosures (三垣)	紫微垣	Zǐ Wēi Yuán	Purple Forbidden enclosure	北斗	Běidǒu	Northern Dipper	γ UMa	Phecda (for component A)	軍市西北星	Jūnshìxīběixīng	Star in the northwest of Market for Soldiers
Three Enclosures (三垣)	紫微垣	Zǐ Wēi Yuán	Purple Forbidden enclosure	北斗	Běidǒu	Northern Dipper	γ UMa	Phecda (for component A)	真人	Zhēnrén	Daoist spiritual master
Three Enclosures (三垣)	紫微垣	Zǐ Wēi Yuán	Purple Forbidden enclosure	北斗	Běidǒu	Northern Dipper	γ UMa	Phecda (for component A)	囚宿	Qiúsù	Constellation of prisoner
Three Enclosures (三垣)	紫微垣	Zǐ Wēi Yuán	Purple Forbidden enclosure	北斗	Běidǒu	Northern Dipper	γ UMa	Phecda (for component A)	次桃花	Cìtáohuā	Next peach blossom
Three Enclosures (三垣)	紫微垣	Zǐ Wēi Yuán	Purple Forbidden enclosure	北斗	Běidǒu	Northern Dipper	γ UMa	Phecda (for component A)	祸害	Huòhài	Disaster
Three Enclosures (三垣)	紫微垣	Zǐ Wēi Yuán	Purple Forbidden enclosure	北斗	Běidǒu	Northern Dipper	δ UMa	Megrez			
Three Enclosures (三垣)	紫微垣	Zǐ Wēi Yuán	Purple Forbidden enclosure	北斗	Běidǒu	Northern Dipper	δ UMa	Megrez	北斗四	Běidǒusì	4th star
Three Enclosures (三垣)	紫微垣	Zǐ Wēi Yuán	Purple Forbidden enclosure	北斗	Běidǒu	Northern Dipper	δ UMa	Megrez	天權	Tiānquán	The Celestial Balance
Three Enclosures (三垣)	紫微垣	Zǐ Wēi Yuán	Purple Forbidden enclosure	北斗	Běidǒu	Northern Dipper	δ UMa	Megrez	權星	Quánxīng	Star of authority
Three Enclosures (三垣)	紫微垣	Zǐ Wēi Yuán	Purple Forbidden enclosure	北斗	Běidǒu	Northern Dipper	δ UMa	Megrez	文曲星	Wénqūxīng	Star of wrong-writing
Three Enclosures (三垣)	紫微垣	Zǐ Wēi Yuán	Purple Forbidden enclosure	北斗	Běidǒu	Northern Dipper	δ UMa	Megrez	伐星	Fáxīng	Cutting-down star
Three Enclosures (三垣)	紫微垣	Zǐ Wēi Yuán	Purple Forbidden enclosure	北斗	Běidǒu	Northern Dipper	δ UMa	Megrez	天辅	Tiānfǔ	Celestial assistant
Three Enclosures (三垣)	紫微垣	Zǐ Wēi Yuán	Purple Forbidden enclosure	北斗	Běidǒu	Northern Dipper	δ UMa	Megrez	玄冥	Xuánmíng	The mysterious underworld
Three Enclosures (三垣)	紫微垣	Zǐ Wēi Yuán	Purple Forbidden enclosure	北斗	Běidǒu	Northern Dipper	δ UMa	Megrez	玄武	Xuánwǔ	God of the north sky
Three Enclosures (三垣)	紫微垣	Zǐ Wēi Yuán	Purple Forbidden enclosure	北斗	Běidǒu	Northern Dipper	δ UMa	Megrez	真武	Zhēnwǔ	Lord of profound heaven
Three Enclosures (三垣)	紫微垣	Zǐ Wēi Yuán	Purple Forbidden enclosure	北斗	Běidǒu	Northern Dipper	δ UMa	Megrez	六煞	Liùshà	Six friends
Three Enclosures (三垣)	紫微垣	Zǐ Wēi Yuán	Purple Forbidden enclosure	北斗	Běidǒu	Northern Dipper	ε UMa	Alioth			
Three Enclosures (三垣)	紫微垣	Zǐ Wēi Yuán	Purple Forbidden enclosure	北斗	Běidǒu	Northern Dipper	ε UMa	Alioth	北斗五	Běidǒuwǔ	5th star
Three Enclosures (三垣)	紫微垣	Zǐ Wēi Yuán	Purple Forbidden enclosure	北斗	Běidǒu	Northern Dipper	ε UMa	Alioth	玉衡	Yùhéng	The Jade Sighting-Tube
Three Enclosures (三垣)	紫微垣	Zǐ Wēi Yuán	Purple Forbidden enclosure	北斗	Běidǒu	Northern Dipper	ε UMa	Alioth	衡星	Héngxīng	Star of measure
Three Enclosures (三垣)	紫微垣	Zǐ Wēi Yuán	Purple Forbidden enclosure	北斗	Běidǒu	Northern Dipper	ε UMa	Alioth	廉贞	Liánzhēn	Honest and chaste
Three Enclosures (三垣)	紫微垣	Zǐ Wēi Yuán	Purple Forbidden enclosure	北斗	Běidǒu	Northern Dipper	ε UMa	Alioth	杀星	Shāxīng	Weaken star
Three Enclosures (三垣)	紫微垣	Zǐ Wēi Yuán	Purple Forbidden enclosure	北斗	Běidǒu	Northern Dipper	ε UMa	Alioth	天禽	Tiānqín	Celestial birds
Three Enclosures (三垣)	紫微垣	Zǐ Wēi Yuán	Purple Forbidden enclosure	北斗	Běidǒu	Northern Dipper	ε UMa	Alioth	五鬼	Wǔguǐ	Five chief demons
Three Enclosures (三垣)	紫微垣	Zǐ Wēi Yuán	Purple Forbidden enclosure	北斗	Běidǒu	Northern Dipper	ζ UMa	Mizar			
Three Enclosures (三垣)	紫微垣	Zǐ Wēi Yuán	Purple Forbidden enclosure	北斗	Běidǒu	Northern Dipper	ζ UMa	Mizar	北斗六	Běidǒuliù	6th star
Three Enclosures (三垣)	紫微垣	Zǐ Wēi Yuán	Purple Forbidden enclosure	北斗	Běidǒu	Northern Dipper	ζ UMa	Mizar	開陽	Kāiyáng	The Opener of Heat
Three Enclosures (三垣)	紫微垣	Zǐ Wēi Yuán	Purple Forbidden enclosure	北斗	Běidǒu	Northern Dipper	ζ UMa	Mizar	衡星	Kāixīng	Star of opener
Three Enclosures (三垣)	紫微垣	Zǐ Wēi Yuán	Purple Forbidden enclosure	北斗	Běidǒu	Northern Dipper	ζ UMa	Mizar	武曲	Wǔqū	Wrong martial
Three Enclosures (三垣)	紫微垣	Zǐ Wēi Yuán	Purple Forbidden enclosure	北斗	Běidǒu	Northern Dipper	ζ UMa	Mizar	危星	Wēixīng	Star of danger
Three Enclosures (三垣)	紫微垣	Zǐ Wēi Yuán	Purple Forbidden enclosure	北斗	Běidǒu	Northern Dipper	ζ UMa	Mizar	北极	Běijí	the North Pole
Three Enclosures (三垣)	紫微垣	Zǐ Wēi Yuán	Purple Forbidden enclosure	北斗	Běidǒu	Northern Dipper	ζ UMa	Mizar	财星	Cáixīng	Star of money
Three Enclosures (三垣)	紫微垣	Zǐ Wēi Yuán	Purple Forbidden enclosure	北斗	Běidǒu	Northern Dipper	ζ UMa	Mizar	延年	Yánnián	Prolong life
Three Enclosures (三垣)	紫微垣	Zǐ Wēi Yuán	Purple Forbidden enclosure	北斗	Běidǒu	Northern Dipper	η UMa	Alkaid			
Three Enclosures (三垣)	紫微垣	Zǐ Wēi Yuán	Purple Forbidden enclosure	北斗	Běidǒu	Northern Dipper	η UMa	Alkaid	北斗七	Běidǒuqī	7th star
Three Enclosures (三垣)	紫微垣	Zǐ Wēi Yuán	Purple Forbidden enclosure	北斗	Běidǒu	Northern Dipper	η UMa	Alkaid	搖光	Yáoguāng	The Twinkling Brilliance
Three Enclosures (三垣)	紫微垣	Zǐ Wēi Yuán	Purple Forbidden enclosure	北斗	Běidǒu	Northern Dipper	η UMa	Alkaid	摇星	Yáoxīng	Shaking star
Three Enclosures (三垣)	紫微垣	Zǐ Wēi Yuán	Purple Forbidden enclosure	北斗	Běidǒu	Northern Dipper	η UMa	Alkaid	破軍	Pòjūn	Captured army
Three Enclosures (三垣)	紫微垣	Zǐ Wēi Yuán	Purple Forbidden enclosure	北斗	Běidǒu	Northern Dipper	η UMa	Alkaid	部星	Bùxīng	Star of ministry
Three Enclosures (三垣)	紫微垣	Zǐ Wēi Yuán	Purple Forbidden enclosure	北斗	Běidǒu	Northern Dipper	η UMa	Alkaid	应星	Yìngxīng	Complying star
Three Enclosures (三垣)	紫微垣	Zǐ Wēi Yuán	Purple Forbidden enclosure	北斗	Běidǒu	Northern Dipper	η UMa	Alkaid	關星	Guānxīng	Star of mountain pass
Three Enclosures (三垣)	紫微垣	Zǐ Wēi Yuán	Purple Forbidden enclosure	北斗	Běidǒu	Northern Dipper	η UMa	Alkaid	耗星	Hàoxīng	Star of news
Three Enclosures (三垣)	紫微垣	Zǐ Wēi Yuán	Purple Forbidden enclosure	北斗	Běidǒu	Northern Dipper	η UMa	Alkaid	天衡	Tiānhéng	Celestial measure
Three Enclosures (三垣)	紫微垣	Zǐ Wēi Yuán	Purple Forbidden enclosure	北斗	Běidǒu	Northern Dipper	η UMa	Alkaid	絕命	Juémìng	Extinction
Three Enclosures (三垣)	紫微垣	Zǐ Wēi Yuán	Purple Forbidden enclosure	北斗	Běidǒu	Northern Dipper	η UMa	Alkaid	魉星	Liǎngxīng	Star of fairy
Three Enclosures (三垣)	紫微垣	Zǐ Wēi Yuán	Purple Forbidden enclosure	北斗	Běidǒu	Northern Dipper	32 UMa		天樞增一	Tiānshūzēngyī	1st additional star of The Celestial Pivot
Three Enclosures (三垣)	紫微垣	Zǐ Wēi Yuán	Purple Forbidden enclosure	北斗	Běidǒu	Northern Dipper	35 UMa		天樞增二	Tiānshūzēngèr	2nd additional star of The Celestial Pivot
Three Enclosures (三垣)	紫微垣	Zǐ Wēi Yuán	Purple Forbidden enclosure	北斗	Běidǒu	Northern Dipper	38 UMa		天樞增三	Tiānshūzēngsān	3rd additional star of The Celestial Pivot
Three Enclosures (三垣)	紫微垣	Zǐ Wēi Yuán	Purple Forbidden enclosure	北斗	Běidǒu	Northern Dipper	36 UMa		天璇增一	Tiānxuánzēngyī	1st additional star of The Celestial Rotating Jade
Three Enclosures (三垣)	紫微垣	Zǐ Wēi Yuán	Purple Forbidden enclosure	北斗	Běidǒu	Northern Dipper	37 UMa		天璇增二	Tiānxuánzēngèr	2nd additional star of The Celestial Rotating Jade
Three Enclosures (三垣)	紫微垣	Zǐ Wēi Yuán	Purple Forbidden enclosure	北斗	Běidǒu	Northern Dipper	42 UMa		天璇增三	Tiānxuánzēngsān	3rd additional star of The Celestial Rotating Jade
Three Enclosures (三垣)	紫微垣	Zǐ Wēi Yuán	Purple Forbidden enclosure	北斗	Běidǒu	Northern Dipper	41 UMa		天璇增四	Tiānxuánzēngsì	4th additional star of The Celestial Rotating Jade
Three Enclosures (三垣)	紫微垣	Zǐ Wēi Yuán	Purple Forbidden enclosure	北斗	Běidǒu	Northern Dipper	39 UMa		天璇增五	Tiānxuánzēngwǔ	5th additional star of The Celestial Rotating Jade
Three Enclosures (三垣)	紫微垣	Zǐ Wēi Yuán	Purple Forbidden enclosure	北斗	Běidǒu	Northern Dipper	40 UMa		天璇增六	Tiānxuánzēngliù	6th additional star of The Celestial Rotating Jade
Three Enclosures (三垣)	紫微垣	Zǐ Wēi Yuán	Purple Forbidden enclosure	北斗	Běidǒu	Northern Dipper	43 UMa		天璇增七	Tiānxuánzēngqī	7th additional star of The Celestial Rotating Jade
Three Enclosures (三垣)	紫微垣	Zǐ Wēi Yuán	Purple Forbidden enclosure	北斗	Běidǒu	Northern Dipper	44 UMa		天璇增八	Tiānxuánzēngbā	8th additional star of The Celestial Rotating Jade
Three Enclosures (三垣)	紫微垣	Zǐ Wēi Yuán	Purple Forbidden enclosure	北斗	Běidǒu	Northern Dipper	74 UMa		天權增一	Tiānquánzēngyī	1st additional star of The Celestial Balance
Three Enclosures (三垣)	紫微垣	Zǐ Wēi Yuán	Purple Forbidden enclosure	北斗	Běidǒu	Northern Dipper	70 UMa		天權增二	Tiānquánzēngèr	2nd additional star of The Celestial Balance
Three Enclosures (三垣)	紫微垣	Zǐ Wēi Yuán	Purple Forbidden enclosure	北斗	Běidǒu	Northern Dipper	73 UMa		天權增三	Tiānquánzēngèr	3rd additional star of The Celestial Balance
Three Enclosures (三垣)	紫微垣	Zǐ Wēi Yuán	Purple Forbidden enclosure	北斗	Běidǒu	Northern Dipper	82 UMa		開陽增二	Kāiyángzēngèr	2nd additional star of The Opener of Heat
Three Enclosures (三垣)	紫微垣	Zǐ Wēi Yuán	Purple Forbidden enclosure	輔	Fǔ	Assistant					
Three Enclosures (三垣)	紫微垣	Zǐ Wēi Yuán	Purple Forbidden enclosure	輔	Fǔ	Assistant	80 UMa	Alcor	輔	Fǔ	(One star of)
Three Enclosures (三垣)	紫微垣	Zǐ Wēi Yuán	Purple Forbidden enclosure	輔	Fǔ	Assistant	83 UMa		輔增一	Fǔzēngyī	1st additional star
Three Enclosures (三垣)	紫微垣	Zǐ Wēi Yuán	Purple Forbidden enclosure	輔	Fǔ	Assistant	84 UMa		輔增二	Fǔzēngèr	2nd additional star
Three Enclosures (三垣)	紫微垣	Zǐ Wēi Yuán	Purple Forbidden enclosure	輔	Fǔ	Assistant	86 UMa		輔增三	Fǔzēngsān	3rd additional star
Three Enclosures (三垣)	太微垣	Tài Wēi Yuán	Supreme Palace enclosure								
Three Enclosures (三垣)	太微垣	Tài Wēi Yuán	Supreme Palace enclosure	常陳	Chángchén	Imperial Guards	67 UMa		常陳七	Chángchénqī	7th star
Three Enclosures (三垣)	太微垣	Tài Wēi Yuán	Supreme Palace enclosure	三台	Sāntái	Three Steps					
Three Enclosures (三垣)	太微垣	Tài Wēi Yuán	Supreme Palace enclosure	三台	Sāntái	Three Steps	ι UMa	Talitha			
Three Enclosures (三垣)	太微垣	Tài Wēi Yuán	Supreme Palace enclosure	三台	Sāntái	Three Steps	ι UMa	Talitha	上台一	Shàngtáiyī	The First Upper Step
Three Enclosures (三垣)	太微垣	Tài Wēi Yuán	Supreme Palace enclosure	三台	Sāntái	Three Steps	ι UMa	Talitha	天子	Tiānzǐ	The rightful emperor
Three Enclosures (三垣)	太微垣	Tài Wēi Yuán	Supreme Palace enclosure	三台	Sāntái	Three Steps	κ UMa	Alkaphrah (for component A)			
Three Enclosures (三垣)	太微垣	Tài Wēi Yuán	Supreme Palace enclosure	三台	Sāntái	Three Steps	κ UMa	Alkaphrah (for component A)	上台二	Shàngtáièr	The Second Upper Step
Three Enclosures (三垣)	太微垣	Tài Wēi Yuán	Supreme Palace enclosure	三台	Sāntái	Three Steps	κ UMa	Alkaphrah (for component A)	女主	Nǚzhǔ	The queen
Three Enclosures (三垣)	太微垣	Tài Wēi Yuán	Supreme Palace enclosure	三台	Sāntái	Three Steps	λ UMa	Tania Borealis			
Three Enclosures (三垣)	太微垣	Tài Wēi Yuán	Supreme Palace enclosure	三台	Sāntái	Three Steps	λ UMa	Tania Borealis	中台一	Zhōngtáiyī	The First Middle Step
Three Enclosures (三垣)	太微垣	Tài Wēi Yuán	Supreme Palace enclosure	三台	Sāntái	Three Steps	λ UMa	Tania Borealis	诸侯三公	Zhūhóusāngōng	The three feudal princes
Three Enclosures (三垣)	太微垣	Tài Wēi Yuán	Supreme Palace enclosure	三台	Sāntái	Three Steps	μ UMa	Tania Australis			
Three Enclosures (三垣)	太微垣	Tài Wēi Yuán	Supreme Palace enclosure	三台	Sāntái	Three Steps	μ UMa	Tania Australis	中台一	Zhōngtáièr	The Second Middle Step
Three Enclosures (三垣)	太微垣	Tài Wēi Yuán	Supreme Palace enclosure	三台	Sāntái	Three Steps	μ UMa	Tania Australis	卿大夫	Qīngdàifu	The high-ranking minister
Three Enclosures (三垣)	太微垣	Tài Wēi Yuán	Supreme Palace enclosure	三台	Sāntái	Three Steps	ν UMa	Alula Borealis			
Three Enclosures (三垣)	太微垣	Tài Wēi Yuán	Supreme Palace enclosure	三台	Sāntái	Three Steps	ν UMa	Alula Borealis	下台一	Xiàtáiyī	The First Lower Step
Three Enclosures (三垣)	太微垣	Tài Wēi Yuán	Supreme Palace enclosure	三台	Sāntái	Three Steps	ν UMa	Alula Borealis	士	Shì	The senior minister
Three Enclosures (三垣)	太微垣	Tài Wēi Yuán	Supreme Palace enclosure	三台	Sāntái	Three Steps	ν UMa	Alula Borealis	东北柱	Dōngběizhù	The northeast pillar
Three Enclosures (三垣)	太微垣	Tài Wēi Yuán	Supreme Palace enclosure	三台	Sāntái	Three Steps	ξ UMa	Alula Australis			
Three Enclosures (三垣)	太微垣	Tài Wēi Yuán	Supreme Palace enclosure	三台	Sāntái	Three Steps	ξ UMa	Alula Australis	下台二	Xiàtáièr	The Second Lower Step
Three Enclosures (三垣)	太微垣	Tài Wēi Yuán	Supreme Palace enclosure	三台	Sāntái	Three Steps	ξ UMa	Alula Australis	庶人	Shùrén	The numerous man
Three Enclosures (三垣)	太微垣	Tài Wēi Yuán	Supreme Palace enclosure	三台	Sāntái	Three Steps	41 Lyn		上台增七	Shàngtáizēngqī	7th additional star of Upper Step
Three Enclosures (三垣)	太微垣	Tài Wēi Yuán	Supreme Palace enclosure	三台	Sāntái	Three Steps	HD 89501		中台增三	Zhōngtáizēngsān	3rd additional star of Middle Step
Three Enclosures (三垣)	太微垣	Tài Wēi Yuán	Supreme Palace enclosure	三台	Sāntái	Three Steps	HD 89221		中台增四	Zhōngtáizēngsì	4th additional star of Middle Step
Three Enclosures (三垣)	太微垣	Tài Wēi Yuán	Supreme Palace enclosure	三台	Sāntái	Three Steps	61 UMa		下台增一	Xiàtáizēngyī	1st additional star of Lower Step
Three Enclosures (三垣)	太微垣	Tài Wēi Yuán	Supreme Palace enclosure	三台	Sāntái	Three Steps	62 UMa		下台增二	Xiàtáizēngèr	2nd additional star of Lower Step

== See also ==
- Traditional Chinese star names
- Chinese constellations
