= Muscida (disambiguation) =

The traditional star name Muscida has been applied to:

- ο Ursae Majoris (1 Ursae Majoris), this name is IAU-approved
- π Ursae Majoris, an optical double star consisting of:
  - π¹ Ursae Majoris (3 Ursae Majoris)
  - π² Ursae Majoris (4 Ursae Majoris)

The name derives from the post classical Latin musus, meaning "snout, or muzzle [of the bear]".
