= Omega Ursae Majoris =

Binary system in the constellation Ursa Major

ω Ursae Majoris
- Location of ω Ursae Majoris (circled)

Observation data Epoch J2000.0 Equinox J2000.0 (ICRS)
- Constellation: Ursa Major
- Right ascension: 10^{h} 53^{m} 58.74035^{s}
- Declination: +43° 11′ 23.8483″
- Apparent magnitude (V): 4.61

Characteristics
- Evolutionary stage: main sequence
- Spectral type: A1VsSi: or A0 IV−V
- U−B color index: −0.11
- B−V color index: −0.04

Astrometry
Radial velocity (R_{v})	−18.70±0.80 km/s
Proper motion (μ)	RA: +42.97 mas/yr Dec.: −23.62 mas/yr
Parallax (π)	13.24±0.50 mas
Distance	246 ± 9 ly (76 ± 3 pc)
Absolute magnitude (M_{V})	+0.86

Orbit
Period (P)	15.8307 d
Eccentricity (e)	0.31
Periastron epoch (T)	2435185.246 JD
Argument of periastron (ω) (secondary)	27.3°
Semi-amplitude (K_{1}) (primary)	22.2 km/s

Details
Radius	2.5 R_{☉}
Luminosity	76 L_{☉}
Surface gravity (log g)	3.88 cgs
Temperature	9,647 K
Rotational velocity (v sin i)	47 km/s
Age	325 Myr

Other designations
- ω UMa, 45 Ursae Majoris, BD+43°2058, FK5 2870, HD 94334, HIP 53295, HR 4248, SAO 43512

Database references
SIMBAD	data

Omega Ursae Majoris (Omega UMa, ω Ursae Majoris, ω UMa) is a binary star system in the northern circumpolar constellation of Ursa Major. It is visible to the naked eye with an apparent visual magnitude of 4.61. Based upon an annual parallax shift of 13.24 mas, it is roughly 246 light years from the Sun. At that distance, the visual magnitude of the star is diminished by an extinction factor of 0.11 due to interstellar dust.

This is a single-lined spectroscopic binary star system with an orbital period of 15.8 days and an eccentricity of 0.31. The primary member, component A, is an A-type main sequence star with a stellar classification of A1VsSi:. The stellar spectrum has the appearance of a hot Am star, showing overabundances of many iron-peak and heavier elements, but an underabundance of helium. In particular, it has an abnormal abundance of silicon.

== Naming ==
In Chinese, 天牢 (Tiān Láo), meaning Celestial Prison, refers to an asterism consisting of ω Ursae Majoris, 57 Ursae Majoris, 47 Ursae Majoris, 58 Ursae Majoris, 49 Ursae Majoris and 56 Ursae Majoris. Consequently, the Chinese name for ω Ursae Majoris itself is 天牢一 (Tiān Láo yī, English: the First Star of Celestial Prison.).
