= HAT-P-13c =

Substellar object orbiting HAT-P-13

Discovery
- Discovered by: Bakos et al.
- Discovery site: United States
- Discovery date: 21 July 2009
- Detection method: Radial velocity

Orbital characteristics
- Apastron: 2.006 AU (300,100,000 km)
- Periastron: 0.366 AU (54,800,000 km)
- Semi-major axis: 1.186^{+0.018}_{−0.033} AU
- Eccentricity: 0.691 ± 0.018
- Orbital period (sidereal): 428.5 ± 3 d 1.173 ± 0.008 y
- Time of periastron: 2454890.05 ± 0.48
- Argument of periastron: 176.7 ± 0.5
- Star: HAT-P-13

HAT-P-13c is a substellar object orbiting the star HAT-P-13 located 698 light years away from Earth in the constellation of Ursa Major. A search for transits was negative, however only 72% of the possible transit configurations could be ruled out. With a mass at least 15.2 times that of Jupiter, it may be a massive planet or a small brown dwarf. The gravitational effect of this object on the inner transiting planet HAT-P-13b may allow a precise determination of the inner planet's internal structure.
