= HD 85945 =

Giant star in the constellation Ursa Major

Observation data Epoch J2000 Equinox J2000
- Constellation: Ursa Major
- Right ascension: 09^{h} 57^{m} 13.61^{s}
- Declination: +57° 25′ 05.54″
- Apparent magnitude (V): 5.959±0.009

Characteristics
- Evolutionary stage: Horizontal branch
- Spectral type: G6III:Fe-0.5
- Apparent magnitude (B): 6.854±0.015
- Apparent magnitude (G): 5.733
- Apparent magnitude (J): 4.513±0.028
- Apparent magnitude (H): 4.141±0.036
- Apparent magnitude (K): 3.978±0.3
- B−V color index: 0.895

Astrometry
Radial velocity (R_{v})	−46.55±0.12 km/s
Proper motion (μ)	RA: 31.347 mas/yr Dec.: -61.766 mas/yr
Parallax (π)	7.4137±0.024 mas
Distance	432.08 ly (132.54 pc)
Absolute magnitude (M_{V})	0.16

Details
Mass	2.5 M_{☉}
Radius	10.28±0.14 R_{☉}
Luminosity	77.62 (Note: From a logarithm of 1.62.) L_{☉}
Surface gravity (log g)	2.6866 cgs
Temperature	5281±22 K
Metallicity [Fe/H]	–0.4 dex
Rotational velocity (v sin i)	7.53 km/s
Age	660.7 (Note: from a logarithm of 8.82.) Myr

Other designations
- BD+58 1224, HIP 48802, HR 3922, PPM 32387, TIC 377368616, TYC 3817-1649-1, GSC 03817-01649, IRAS 09537+5739, Gaia DR2 1046383298937140864, Gaia DR3 1046383298937140864

Database references
SIMBAD	data

HD 85945 (HR 3922) is a star in the constellation Ursa Major. It is a yellow giant star with a spectral type of G6III:Fe-0.5. Based on information from Gaia DR3, it is located 132.54 parsecs (432.3 ly) from Earth and is moving towards Earth at a velocity of 47 km/s. It has an apparent magnitude of 5.96, which makes it faintly visible to the naked eye.

== Characteristics ==
It is an evolved G-type giant star, based on its spectral type of G6III:Fe-0.5, which also indicates that it has a [Fe/H] metallicity of -0.5. HD 85945 is 2.5 times more massive than the Sun and has expanded to 10.28 times the Sun's size. It is emitting 78 times the solar luminosity from its photosphere at an effective temperature of 5,281 K. Currently, the star is located in the horizontal branch stage of evolution. The age of HD 85945 is estimated at 660 million years, and it rotates under its axis at a speed of 7.53 km/s. It is slightly metal-poor compared to the Sun, with an abundance of iron equivalent to 40% of the solar abundance. (Note: From a logarithm of -0.4)

HD 85945 is located within the Ursa Major constellation. The distance to HD 85945 is of 132.54 parsecs (432.3 ly), based on spectra from Gaia DR3. The apparent magnitude of the star is of 5.96, which is brighter than the limiting magnitude for naked-eye vision (6.5^{m}), making it faintly visible to the naked eye. The absolute magnitude, i.e. the brightness of the star if it was seen at a distance of 10 parsecs (32.6 ly), is 0.32. At the current distance, its brightness is diminished by 0.03 magnitudes due to interstellar extinction between Earth and the star. HD 85945 is moving away from Earth at a velocity of 46.55 km/s. It has a high proper motion in the sky.
