= HD 91312 =

Star in the constellation Ursa Major

- Location of HD 91312 (circled in red)

Observation data Epoch J2000 Equinox ICRS
- Constellation: Ursa Major
- Right ascension: 10^{h} 33^{m} 13.88880^{s}
- Declination: +40° 25′ 32.0172″
- Apparent magnitude (V): 4.72 (4.750 + 11.60)

Characteristics
- Spectral type: A7IV-V + M
- B−V color index: 0.222±0.013

Astrometry
Radial velocity (R_{v})	9.0±4.2 km/s
Proper motion (μ)	RA: −138.103 mas/yr Dec.: 3.172 mas/yr
Parallax (π)	29.8168±0.2283 mas
Distance	109.4 ± 0.8 ly (33.5 ± 0.3 pc)
Absolute magnitude (M_{V})	2.02

Orbit
Period (P)	292.56 d
Semi-major axis (a)	≥1.56×10^{7} km
Eccentricity (e)	0.30
Periastron epoch (T)	2,419,108 JD
Argument of periastron (ω) (secondary)	311°
Semi-amplitude (K_{1}) (primary)	14.5 km/s

Orbit
Primary	A
Name	B
Semi-major axis (a)	9.7+1.0 −1.3 au
Eccentricity (e)	0.219+0.10 −0.064
Inclination (i)	85.63+0.71 −0.82°

Details

A
Mass	1.61+0.40 −0.29 M_{☉}
Radius	1.97+0.07 −0.02 R_{☉}
Luminosity	11.965+0.107 −0.088 L_{☉}
Surface gravity (log g)	4.0 cgs
Temperature	7,648+34 −472 K
Rotational velocity (v sin i)	119 km/s
Age	0.35–1.5 Gyr

B
Mass	0.337+0.042 −0.044 M_{☉}
Radius	2.43±0.05 R_{Jup}
Luminosity	10^{−2.09+0.12 −0.13} L_{☉}
Surface gravity (log g)	4.0+1.5 −0.5 cgs
Temperature	3,400+100 −200 K
Age	0.35–1.5 Gyr

Other designations
- BD+41°2101, HD 91312, HIP 51658, HR 4132, SAO 43379, ADS 7826 A, WDS J10332+4026A, TYC 3005-1206-1, 2MASS J10331388+4025316

Database references
SIMBAD	data

HD 91312 is a multiple star system in the northern circumpolar constellation Ursa Major. Faintly visible to the naked eye, it is the brightest star of Ursa Major without Flamsteed designation with a combined apparent visual magnitude of 4.72. The system is located at a distance of 109 light-years from the Sun based on parallax. The radial velocity is poorly constrained, but it appears to be drifting further away at a rate of ~9 km/s.

This was identified as a visual binary by John Herschel in 1831. The pair have an angular separation of 23″, equivalent to a linear projected separation of ~796 AU. Variations in the radial velocity as well as direct imaging, indicate the presence of a low-mass stellar companion. This companion is an early-to-mid red dwarf, and orbits the primary on an edge-on orbit with a semi-major axis of 9.7 au. This is a young system with an age of around 200 million years. It display an infrared excess from a circumstellar disk of dusty debris. It has a mean temperature of 35 K and is orbiting 218.1 AU from the inner pair.

This star is relatively bright, but it was rarely included in old catalogues. Catalogues and atlases it was not included in are, for example, those by Ptolemy and all its derivatives and translations (by as-Sufi, al-Biruni, Ulugh Beg, Copernicus, Clavius, etc.), Tycho Brahe, de Houtman, Bayer, Kepler, Schiller, Halley, Flamsteed (as well as published by Carolina Herschel in 1798 catalogue of stars, observed by Flamsteed, but not inserted in his British Catalogue) and Bradley. Catalogues and atlases it was included in are those by Hevelius (1690) (65th in Ursa Major, designated In Ungula sinistri Pedis poster. trium sequens) and Bode (1801) (number 157 of Ursa Major). Bode used extended Bayer designations for some stars, and HD 91312 also was assigned designation "w", whereas original Bayer designations for Ursa Major stars are all Greek letters and Latin letters from "A" to "h".
