= HAT-P-13 =

G-type main sequence star in the constellation Ursa Major

Observation data Epoch J2000.0 Equinox ICRS
- Constellation: Ursa Major
- Right ascension: 08^{h} 39^{m} 31.8072^{s}
- Declination: +47° 21′ 07.274″
- Apparent magnitude (V): 10.62

Characteristics
- Evolutionary stage: subgiant
- Spectral type: G4
- Variable type: Planetary transit

Astrometry
Radial velocity (R_{v})	+14.69(68) km/s
Proper motion (μ)	RA: −24.060(16) mas/yr Dec.: −26.218(17) mas/yr
Parallax (π)	4.0750±0.0186 mas
Distance	800 ± 4 ly (245 ± 1 pc)

Details
Mass	1.261+0.029 −0.023 M_{☉}
Radius	1.73+0.10 −0.09 R_{☉}
Luminosity	2.89 L_{☉}
Surface gravity (log g)	4.13±0.04 cgs
Temperature	5,720±69 K
Metallicity [Fe/H]	0.46±0.07 dex
Rotation	2.96 days
Rotational velocity (v sin i)	3.1±0.9 km/s
Age	5 Gyr

Other designations
- TYC 3416-543-1, GSC 03416-00543, 2MASS J08393180+4721073

Database references
SIMBAD	data
Exoplanet Archive	data

HAT-P-13, also known as GSC 03416-00543, is a G-type subgiant approximately 800 light-years away in the constellation Ursa Major. In 2009 it was discovered that this star is orbited by two massive planets, the innermost of which transits the star. This was the first known example of an extrasolar transiting planet with an additional planet in the same system.

In 2015, a spectroscopic study have revealed a very strong starspot activity of the HAT-P-13 star.

== Planetary system ==
As of 2009, HAT-P-13 has been confirmed to have two extrasolar planets orbiting it. The inner planet was discovered by the transit method and the outer planet was found through the radial velocity method. A search for transits by HAT-P-13c was negative, however only 72% of the possible transit configurations could be ruled out. HAT-P-13 was the first star to have a transiting planet and an additional planet on a known orbit. HAT-P-7 and other planets are known to have additional companions, but there is not enough data to characterize the system. OGLE-TR-111 has one confirmed transiting planet, and one unconfirmed transiting planet.

The innermost planet, HAT-P-13b, has a mass around 90% that of Jupiter and orbits its sun every 2.91624039 days. This classifies the planet as a hot Jupiter, with temperatures exceeding 1000 kelvins. The second companion, HAT-P-13c, has a mass over 15 Jupiters. Because of its mass, this companion could either be a massive planet or a low mass brown dwarf. Either way, HAT-P-13 c orbits its sun every 446 days in an eccentric orbit. Radial velocity measurements also suggest the existence of a third more distant companion in the system. This may be an additional planet, or it may be a brown dwarf or even a small star.

The HAT-P-13 planetary system
Companion (in order from star)	Mass	Semimajor axis (AU)	Orbital period (days)	Eccentricity	Inclination (°)	Radius
b	0.906±0.024 M_{J}	0.04313+0.00033 −0.00026	2.91624039±0.00000081	0.0093+0.0044 −0.0016	82.2+0.6 −0.8	1.487±0.038 R_{J}
c	≥14.28±0.28 M_{J}	1.188+0.018 −0.033	445.81±0.10	0.6616±0.0054	—	—

== See also ==
- HAT-P-12
- HATNet Project
- OGLE-TR-111
