= HD 111456 =

Star in the constellation Ursa Major

Observation data Epoch J2000.0 Equinox ICRS
- Constellation: Ursa Major
- Right ascension: 12^{h} 48^{m} 39.44700^{s}
- Declination: +60° 19′ 11.0379″
- Apparent magnitude (V): 5.85

Characteristics
- Evolutionary stage: main sequence
- Spectral type: F7 V
- U−B color index: −0.04
- B−V color index: +0.46

Astrometry
Radial velocity (R_{v})	−18.0±0.9 km/s
Proper motion (μ)	RA: +120.949 mas/yr Dec.: +35.712 mas/yr
Parallax (π)	38.1905±0.2904 mas
Distance	85.4 ± 0.6 ly (26.2 ± 0.2 pc)
Absolute magnitude (M_{V})	+4.2±0.2

Details
Mass	1.4 M_{☉}
Radius	1.22 R_{☉}
Luminosity	6.45 L_{☉}
Surface gravity (log g)	4.5 cgs
Temperature	6,400 K
Metallicity [Fe/H]	−0.19 dex
Rotation	14.7 days
Rotational velocity (v sin i)	41.5±1.1 km/s
Age	300−400 Myr

Other designations
- BD+61°1320, GJ 9417, HD 111456, HIP 62512, HR 4867, SAO 236405, WDS J12487+6019AB

Database references
SIMBAD	data

HD 111456 is a yellow-white hued star in the northern circumpolar constellation of Ursa Major. It is dimly visible to the naked eye, having an apparent visual magnitude of 5.85. Based upon an annual parallax shift of 38.2 mas as seen from Earth, it is located about 85 light years from the Sun. The star is moving closer to the Sun with a radial velocity of −18 km/s. HD 111456 is a nucleus cluster member of the Ursa Major Moving Group, a set of stars that are moving through space with a similar heading and velocity. Six other stars in the nucleus of the group are prominent members of the Big Dipper asterism.

The stellar classification for this star is F7 V, indicating that it is an ordinary F-type main-sequence star. It is young, around 300−400 million years of age, and is spinning with a relatively high projected rotational velocity of 41.5 km/s. This is one of the most active F-type stars known, and it is a strong emitter of X-rays and an extreme UV source. It is an astrometric binary with a period of four years and a mass ratio of 0.5. Hence, the companion may be a young white dwarf star.
