= HR 4072 =

Star in the constellation Ursa Major

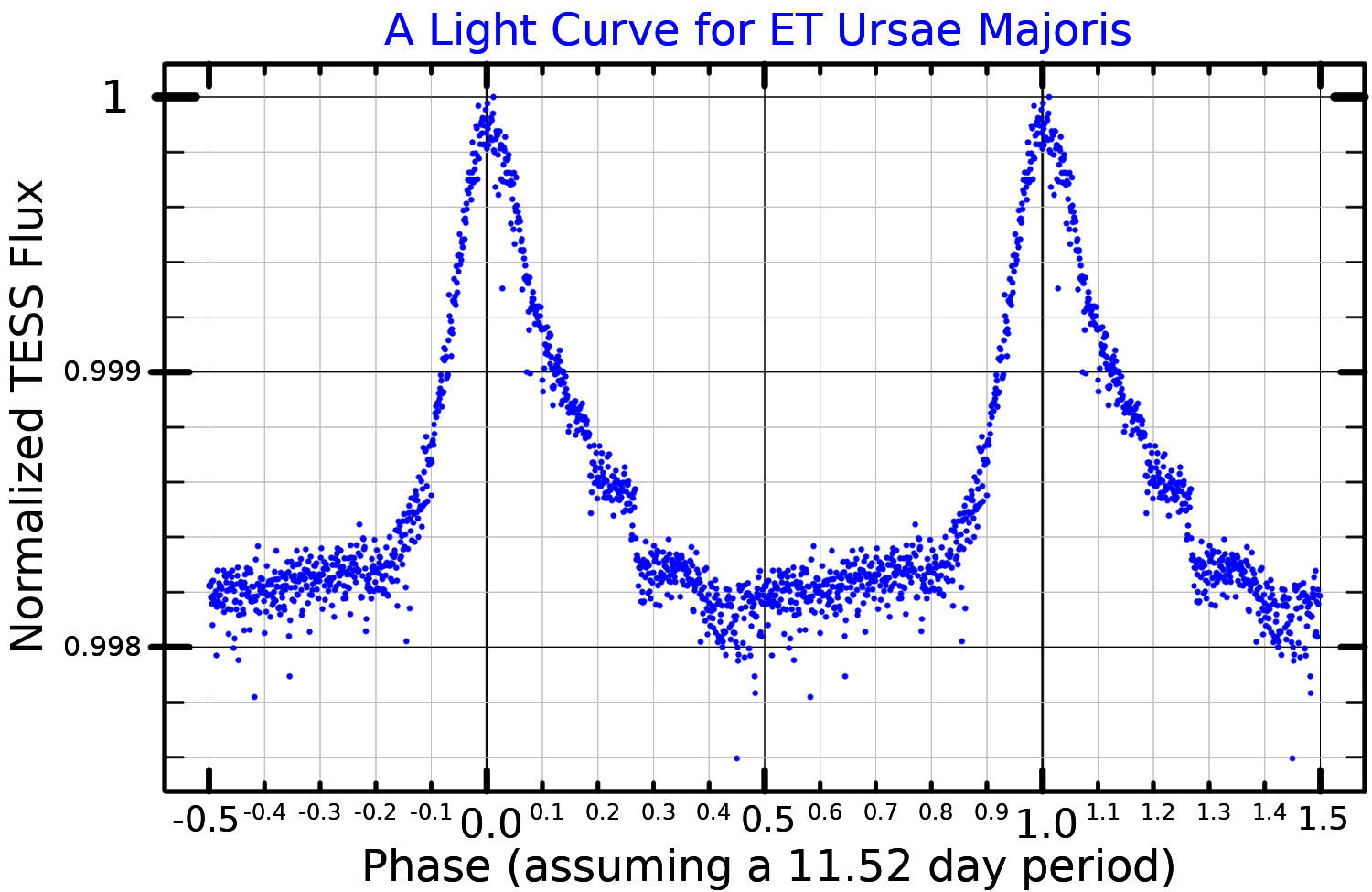
- A light curve for ET Ursae Majoris, plotted from TESS data

Observation data Epoch J2000 Equinox ICRS
- Constellation: Ursa Major
- Right ascension: 10^{h} 24^{m} 07.84801^{s}
- Declination: +65° 33′ 59.1239″
- Apparent magnitude (V): 4.94

Characteristics
- Spectral type: A1:VpSiSrHg
- B−V color index: −0.052±0.012
- Variable type: α^{2} CVn

Astrometry
Radial velocity (R_{v})	−2.24±0.03 km/s
Proper motion (μ)	RA: −9.427 mas/yr Dec.: −20.994 mas/yr
Parallax (π)	9.61±0.20 mas
Distance	339 ± 7 ly (104 ± 2 pc)
Absolute magnitude (M_{V})	−0.15

Orbit
Period (P)	11.579113±0.000010 d
Semi-major axis (a)	1.634±0.001 mas
Eccentricity (e)	0.2943±0.0009
Longitude of the node (Ω)	133.49±0.13°
Periastron epoch (T)	2,457,756.168±0.005 JD
Argument of periastron (ω) (primary)	176.50±0.20°
Semi-amplitude (K_{1}) (primary)	38.17±0.04 km/s
Semi-amplitude (K_{2}) (secondary)	62.11±0.09 km/s

Details

A
Mass	2.779±0.153 M_{☉}
Radius	3.16±0.11 R_{☉}
Luminosity	101±8 L_{☉}
Surface gravity (log g)	3.88±0.05 cgs
Temperature	10,260±100 K
Metallicity	$\begin{smallmatrix}\left[\ce{M}/\ce{H}\right]\end{smallmatrix}$ = +0.11±0.04
Metallicity [Fe/H]	+0.39 dex
Rotational velocity (v sin i)	≤4.2 km/s

B
Mass	1.708±0.094 M_{☉}
Radius	1.73±0.06 R_{☉}
Luminosity	9.7±1.0 L_{☉}
Surface gravity (log g)	4.22±0.05 cgs
Temperature	7,860±140 K
Metallicity	$\begin{smallmatrix}\left[\ce{M}/\ce{H}\right]\end{smallmatrix}$ = −0.05±0.07
Rotational velocity (v sin i)	5.1±2.1 km/s

Other designations
- ET UMa, BD+66 664, GJ 9327, HD 89822, HIP 50933, HR 4072, SAO 15163, PPM 17427, PLX 2433, TYC 4150-1302-1, IRAS 10205+6549, 2MASS J10240782+6533590

Database references
SIMBAD	data

HR 4072 is a binary star system in the northern circumpolar constellation of Ursa Major. It has the variable star designation ET Ursae Majoris, abbreviated ET UMa, while HR 4072 is the system's designation from the Bright Star Catalogue. It has a white hue and is faintly visible to the naked eye with an apparent visual magnitude that fluctuates around 4.94. The system is located at a distance of approximately 339 light years from the Sun based on parallax measurements. The radial velocity measurement is poorly constrained, but it appears to be drifting closer to the Sun at the rate of around −3 km/s.

This is a double-lined spectroscopic binary star system with an orbital period of 11.58 days and an eccentricity of 0.29. The orbit for this star was first determined by R. H. Baker in 1912, then later revised.

The primary, designated component A, is an Ap type chemically-peculiar star with a stellar classification of A1:VpSiSrHg, although it has also been considered to be a mercury-manganese star. The suffix notation indicates abundance anomalies of silicon, strontium, and mercury in the spectrum. It is an α^{2} Canum Venaticorum variable with an amplitude of 0.05 magnitude in the B (blue) band. The star is rotating slowly with a projected rotational velocity of 4.5 km/s. It is three times larger than the Sun, radiating about 100 solar luminosities from its photosphere at an effective temperature of 10,260 K.

The secondary component has been reported to have characteristics of an Am star. It is a F-type star with 1.73 times the size of the Sun and 1.71 times its mass. Its luminosity is about 10 times that of the Sun, or one-tenth of that of the primary, and it has an effective temperature of 7,900 K.
