= 65 Ursae Majoris =

Star system in the constellation Ursa Major

- Location of 65 Ursae Majoris (circled)

Observation data Epoch J2000 Equinox ICRS
- Constellation: Ursa Major
- 65 UMa ABC
- Right ascension: 11^{h} 55^{m} 05.74925^{s}
- Declination: +46° 28′ 36.6408″
- Apparent magnitude (V): +6.54 (A/B/C = 6.7 / 8.5 / 8.32)
- 65 UMa D
- Right ascension: 11^{h} 55^{m} 11.33152^{s}
- Declination: +46° 28′ 11.2150″
- Apparent magnitude (V): +6.965

Characteristics

65 UMa ABC
- Spectral type: A7 / A7 / A3 / ? / ?
- U−B color index: +0.08
- B−V color index: +0.11
- Variable type: Algol

65 UMa D
- Spectral type: A0p
- U−B color index: +0.01
- B−V color index: +0.02

Astrometry

65 UMa ABC
Radial velocity (R_{v})	−3.90±4.4 km/s
Proper motion (μ)	RA: 10.41 mas/yr Dec.: 2.38 mas/yr
Parallax (π)	4.72±0.58 mas
Distance	approx. 690 ly (approx. 210 pc)
Absolute magnitude (M_{V})	−0.05

65 UMa D
Radial velocity (R_{v})	−7.00±3.7 km/s
Proper motion (μ)	RA: 11.82 mas/yr Dec.: 0.39 mas/yr
Parallax (π)	3.37±0.56 mas
Distance	approx. 1,000 ly (approx. 300 pc)
Absolute magnitude (M_{V})	−0.1

Orbit
Primary	65 UMa Aa1
Name	65 UMa Aa2
Period (P)	1.73043 d
Inclination (i)	86.5±0.2°
Semi-amplitude (K_{1}) (primary)	133.3±4.2 km/s
Semi-amplitude (K_{2}) (secondary)	135.7±4.2 km/s

Orbit
Primary	65 UMa Aa
Name	65 UMa Ab
Period (P)	641.5±16.7
Eccentricity (e)	0.169±0.048
Inclination (i)	47°
Semi-amplitude (K_{1}) (primary)	13.7 km/s
Semi-amplitude (K_{2}) (secondary)	19.9±2.7 km/s

Orbit
Primary	65 UMa A
Name	65 UMa B
Period (P)	118.209±0.690 yr
Semi-major axis (a)	208.2±9.7 mas
Eccentricity (e)	0.504±0.006
Inclination (i)	38.1±2.4°
Longitude of the node (Ω)	92.1±4.2°
Periastron epoch (T)	2447516.9±126.8
Argument of periastron (ω) (secondary)	202.7±1.3°

Details

65 UMa Aa1
Mass	1.74±0.06 M_{☉}
Radius	1.86±0.08 R_{☉}
Temperature	8,000 K

65 UMa Aa2
Mass	1.71±0.06 M_{☉}
Radius	1.81±0.08 R_{☉}
Temperature	7,948±20 K

65 UMa Ab
Mass	2.4±0.4 M_{☉}

65 UMa B
Mass	2.4±2.0 M_{☉}

65 UMa C
Mass	2.01 M_{☉}

65 UMa D
Mass	2.31(3.02 + 1.64) M_{☉}
Radius	2.93 R_{☉}
Luminosity	79 L_{☉}
Surface gravity (log g)	3.85 cgs
Temperature	8,600 K
Age	525 Myr

Other designations
- 65 UMa, ADS 8347, CCDM J11551+4629
- 65 UMa ABC: DN UMa, BD+47°1913, HD 103483, HIP 58112, HR 4560, SAO 43945
- 65 UMa D: BD+47°1914, HD 103498, HIP 58117, HR 4561, SAO 43946

Database references
- 65 UMa AB
- 65 UMa C
- 65 UMa D

65 Ursae Majoris, abbreviated as 65 UMa, is a star system in the constellation of Ursa Major. With a combined apparent magnitude of about 6.5, it is at the limit of human eyesight and is just barely visible to the naked eye in ideal conditions. It is about 760 light years away from Earth.

65 Ursae Majoris is a sextuple star system. It contains six stars in a hierarchical orbit where each star orbits its inner stars. Such systems are uncommon, with only a few sextuple stars known. Higher-multiplicity star systems are uncommon because they are less stable than their simpler counterparts, and often decay into smaller systems.

== Multiplicity ==
Aa1
Period = 1.73d a = 0.2 mas
Aa2
Period = 641d a = 11 mas
Ab
Period = 118y a = 0.18″
B
3.4″ separation
C
63″ separation
D

Hierarchy of orbits in the 65 Ursae Majoris system

The central pair of stars, 65 Ursae Majoris Aa1 and Aa2, are both A-type main-sequence stars. These are relatively bright, white-colored stars that typically have masses from 1.6 M_{☉} to 2.4 M_{☉}. They have relatively low masses for A-type main sequence stars and have spectral types of A7V. Its orbital period is 1.73 days.

The innermost binary pair 65 Ursae Majoris Aa is orbited by another star, designated 65 Ursae Majoris Ab. It is a spectroscopic binary: while the pair cannot be resolved, periodic Doppler shifts in their spectra indicate that there must be orbital motion. 65 Ursae Majoris Ab orbits the inner pair with a period of 641 days (1.76 years) and an eccentricity of 0.169.

65 Ursae Majoris B orbits the three inner stars every 118 years. It is separated from the triple by 0.18″, and an astrometric orbit has been calculated. 65 Ursae Majoris C and D are common proper motion companions and are separated 4″ and 63″ respectively from the central system. 65 Ursae Majoris D also appears to be a chemically peculiar star with higher amounts of chromium, strontium, and europium than normal. Because of its unusual composition, determination of its stellar parameters is difficult; the effective temperature of this star may be 9,300 or 9,500 K, with the radius and the surface gravity determined for the star dependent on the effective temperature. Speckle interferometry results have resolved 65 Ursae Majoris D into two components separated by 138 mas but this has not been confirmed by other observers. The two stars resolved differ in brightness by about two magnitudes. An orbit for two stars has been estimated to have a period of about 79 years.

== Variability ==
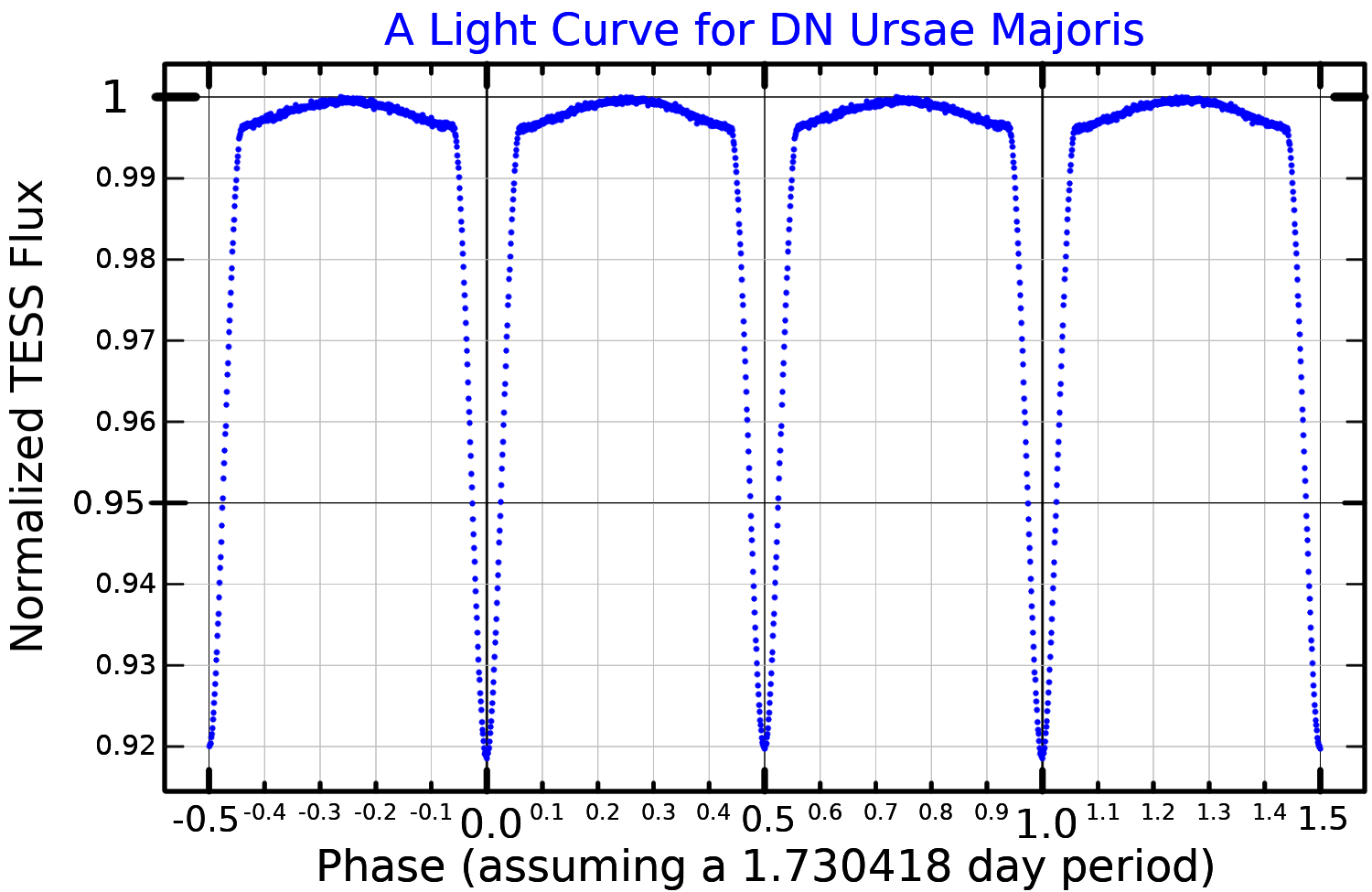
A light curve for DN Ursae Majoris, plotted from TESS data

65 Ursae Majoris A is a variable star with the variable star designation DN Ursae Majoris. The pair Aa1 and Aa2 form an eclipsing binary as they periodically pass in front of each other while orbiting. The primary and secondary eclipses are almost identical and the apparent magnitude of the system varies between 6.55 and 6.65 twice during each orbit of 1.73 days. The brightness variation is very small because the non-eclipsing component Ab is the brightest of the three stars and contributes 80% of the visible light.

== Distance ==
Trigonometric parallax measurements made by the Hipparcos spacecraft put the 65 Ursae Majoris ABC system at a distance of about 690 light years (210 parsecs), and component D at about 1,000 light years (300 parsecs). The dynamical parallax determined from the calculated orbits of the stars gives a distance of 763 ± 95 light-years (234 ± 29 pc). Gaia has published measurements for the AB system and for component D, but they are both highly uncertain. Gaia Early Data Release 3 includes a somewhat more reliable measurement for the parallax of component C at 4.3897±0.0245 mas, implying a distance of about 740 light years.

== See also ==
- Castor, another multiple star system with six stars
- Zeta Phoenicis, a multiple star system including an eclipsing binary
