= 26 Ursae Majoris =

Star in the constellation Ursa Major

- Location of 26 Ursae Majoris (circled in red)

Observation data Epoch J2000 Equinox ICRS
- Constellation: Ursa Major
- Right ascension: 09^{h} 34^{m} 49.43259^{s}
- Declination: +52° 03′ 05.3165″
- Apparent magnitude (V): 4.47

Characteristics
- Evolutionary stage: main sequence
- Spectral type: A0 Vn
- U−B color index: +0.00
- B−V color index: +0.027±0.013

Astrometry
Radial velocity (R_{v})	+22.2±1.1 km/s
Proper motion (μ)	RA: −65.74 mas/yr Dec.: −37.32 mas/yr
Parallax (π)	12.44±0.19 mas
Distance	262 ± 4 ly (80 ± 1 pc)
Absolute magnitude (M_{V})	−0.06

Details
Mass	2.16 M_{☉}
Radius	2.2 R_{☉}
Luminosity	99.2 L_{☉}
Surface gravity (log g)	3.94 cgs
Temperature	9,757±332 K
Rotational velocity (v sin i)	165 km/s
Age	147 Myr

Other designations
- 26 UMa, BD+52°1402, HD 82621, HIP 47006, HR 3799, SAO 27298

Database references
SIMBAD	data

26 Ursae Majoris is a single star in the northern circumpolar constellation of Ursa Major, located 262 light years away from the Sun. It is visible to the naked eye as a faint, white-hued star with an apparent visual magnitude of 4.47. The object is moving further from the Earth with a heliocentric radial velocity of +22 km/s.

This is an A-type main-sequence star with a stellar classification of A0 Vn, where the 'n' indicates "nebulous" lines in the spectrum due to rapid rotation. It has a high rate of spin with a projected rotational velocity of 165 km/s, which is giving it an oblate shape with an equatorial bulge that is 8% larger than the polar radius. The star is 147 million years old with just over double the mass of the Sun and twice the Sun's radius. It is radiating 99 times the Sun's luminosity from its photosphere at an effective temperature of 9,757 K.
