= 55 Ursae Majoris =

Star in the constellation Ursa Major

- Location of 55 Ursae Majoris (circled in red)

Observation data Epoch J2000 Equinox ICRS
- Constellation: Ursa Major
- Right ascension: 11^{h} 19^{m} 07.89965^{s}
- Declination: +38° 11′ 08.0285″
- Apparent magnitude (V): 4.80 (4.78 / 5.3)

Characteristics
- Spectral type: A2V (A1V + A2V + A1V)
- U−B color index: +0.04
- B−V color index: +0.09

Astrometry
Radial velocity (R_{v})	-3.0 ± 2 km/s
Proper motion (μ)	RA: -58.80 mas/yr Dec.: -65.33 mas/yr
Parallax (π)	17.00±0.34 mas
Distance	192 ± 4 ly (59 ± 1 pc)
Absolute magnitude (M_{V})	-0.09 ± 0.20

Orbit
Primary	55 UMa Aa
Name	55 UMa Ab
Period (P)	2.5537985 d
Eccentricity (e)	0.323
Periastron epoch (T)	2449602.368
Argument of periastron (ω) (secondary)	116.8°
Semi-amplitude (K_{1}) (primary)	79.1 km/s
Semi-amplitude (K_{2}) (secondary)	89.1 km/s

Orbit
Primary	55 UMa A
Name	55 UMa B
Period (P)	1872.7 ± 7.4 d
Semi-major axis (a)	0.0913 ± 0.0009″
Eccentricity (e)	0.126 ± 0.008
Inclination (i)	64.8 ± 0.8°
Longitude of the node (Ω)	130.0 ± 0.8°
Periastron epoch (T)	2448805 ± 18
Argument of periastron (ω) (secondary)	223.9 ± 3.7°
Semi-amplitude (K_{1}) (primary)	8.4 ± 1.3 km/s
Semi-amplitude (K_{2}) (secondary)	20.2 ± 6.9 km/s

Details

55 UMa Aa
Mass	2.0 M_{☉}
Surface gravity (log g)	4.25 cgs
Temperature	9230 ± 230 K
Rotational velocity (v sin i)	30 ± 4 km/s

55 UMa Ab
Mass	1.8 M_{☉}
Surface gravity (log g)	4.25 cgs
Temperature	8810 ± 250 K
Rotational velocity (v sin i)	45 ± 5 km/s

55 UMa B
Mass	2.1 M_{☉}
Surface gravity (log g)	4.25 cgs
Temperature	9290 ± 190 K
Rotational velocity (v sin i)	55 ± 5 km/s

Other designations
- BD+38 2225, FK5 1293, HD 98353, HIP 55266, HR 4380, SAO 62491

Database references
SIMBAD	data

55 Ursae Majoris (55 UMa) is a triple star system in the constellation Ursa Major. Its apparent magnitude is 4.80. Two stars form a close spectroscopic binary with an orbital period of 2.55 days. The third star orbits the central pair every 1873 days. All three stars are A-type main-sequence stars.
