= 83 Ursae Majoris =

Candidate binary star system in the constellation Ursa Major

- Location of 83 Ursae Majoris (circled in red)

Observation data Epoch J2000 Equinox J2000
- Constellation: Ursa Major
- Right ascension: 13^{h} 40^{m} 44.27274^{s}
- Declination: +54° 40′ 53.8860″
- Apparent magnitude (V): 4.69–4.75

Characteristics
- Spectral type: M2 III
- B−V color index: +1.630±0.006
- Variable type: SRb

Astrometry
Radial velocity (R_{v})	−18.61±0.20 km/s
Proper motion (μ)	RA: −19.418 mas/yr Dec.: −10.63 mas/yr
Parallax (π)	5.5963±0.1399 mas
Distance	580 ± 10 ly (179 ± 4 pc)
Absolute magnitude (M_{V})	−1.39

Details
Mass	1.1 M_{☉}
Radius	83.3±3.1 R_{☉}
Luminosity	1,250 L_{☉}
Surface gravity (log g)	1.06±0.16 cgs
Temperature	3,705±16 K
Metallicity [Fe/H]	−0.1±0.08 dex

Other designations
- 83 UMa, IQ UMa, BD+55°1625, HD 119228, HIP 66738, HR 5154, SAO 28843

Database references
SIMBAD	data

83 Ursae Majoris is a candidate binary star system in the northern circumpolar constellation of Ursa Major. It is a semiregular variable star, and it has been given the variable star designation IQ Ursae Majoris. It ranges in brightness from apparent visual magnitude 4.69 to 4.75, making it visible to the naked eye under good observing conditions. Percy and Au (1994) identified it as a small-amplitude red variable with an irregular behavior, having a characteristic time scale of 20 days. Based upon an annual parallax shift of 5.60 mas, it is located roughly 580 light-years from the Sun. The system is moving closer with a heliocentric radial velocity of −18.6 km/s.

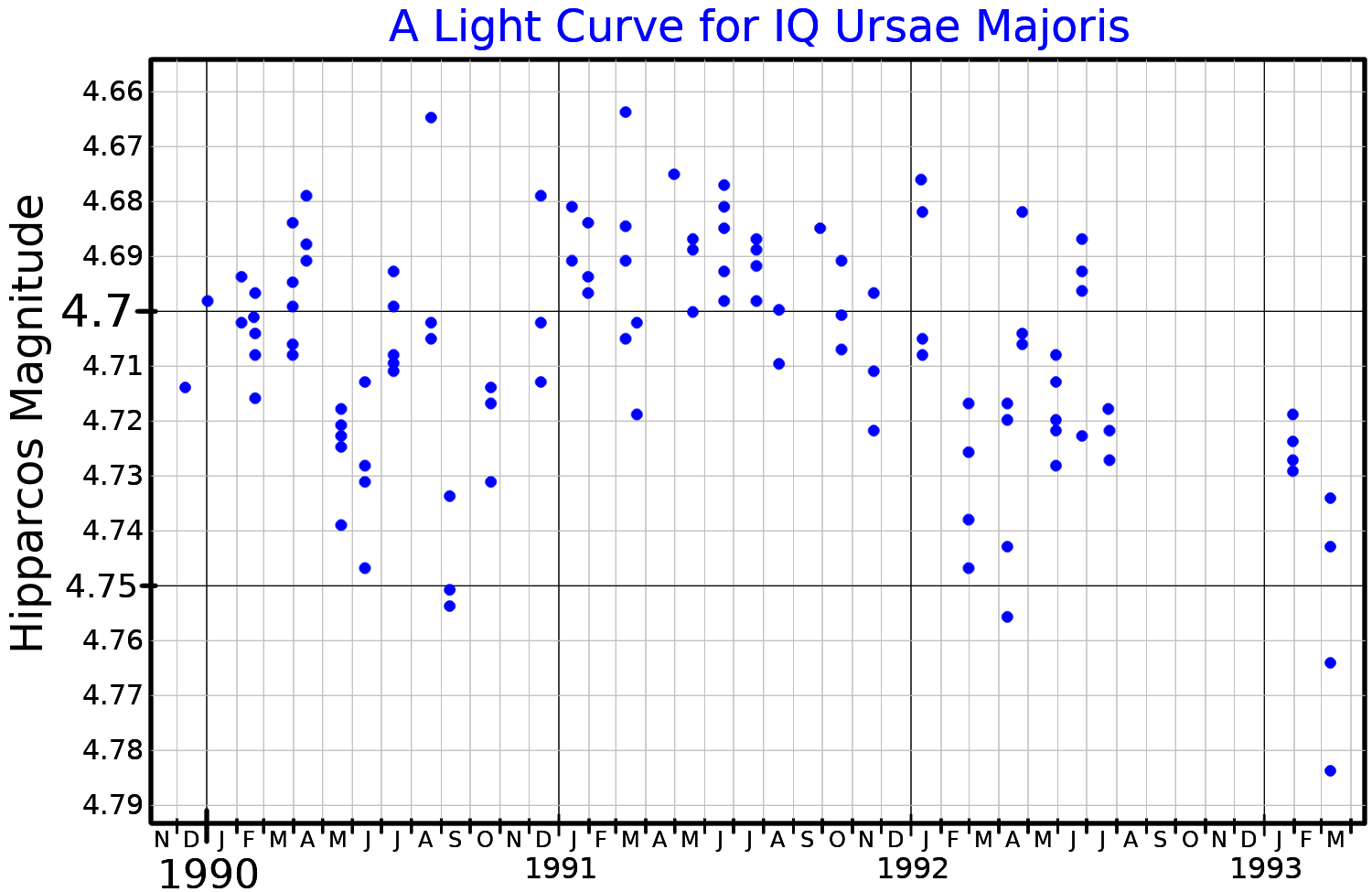
A light curve for IQ Ursae Majoris, plotted from Hipparcos data

The visible component is an evolved red giant with a stellar classification of M2 III. It is a marginal barium star, showing an enhanced abundance of s-process elements in its outer atmosphere. This material may have been acquired during a previous mass transfer from a now white dwarf companion, or self-enriched by a dredge-up during the asymptotic giant branch process.
