= Psi Ursae Majoris =

Star in the constellation Ursa Major

- Location of ψ Ursae Majoris (circled)

Observation data Epoch J2000.0 Equinox J2000.0 (ICRS)
- Constellation: Ursa Major
- Right ascension: 11^{h} 09^{m} 39.8083^{s}
- Declination: +44° 29′ 54.556″
- Apparent magnitude (V): +3.01

Characteristics
- Evolutionary stage: horizontal branch
- Spectral type: K1 III
- U−B color index: +1.12
- B−V color index: +1.14

Astrometry
| Radial velocity (R_{v}) | –3.39 km/s |
| Proper motion (μ) | RA: –62.02 mas/yr Dec.: –27.78 mas/yr |
| Parallax (π) | 23.2272±0.2513 mas |
| Distance | 140 ± 2 ly (43.1 ± 0.5 pc) |
| Absolute magnitude (M_{V}) | −0.27 |

Details
| Mass | 2.31±0.13 M_{☉} |
| Radius | 19.12–20.79 R_{☉} |
| Luminosity | 140±3 L_{☉} |
| Surface gravity (log g) | 2.12±0.05 cgs |
| Temperature | 4,543±6 K |
| Metallicity [Fe/H] | −0.11±0.03 dex |
| Rotational velocity (v sin i) | 5.5 km/s |

Other designations
- ψ UMa, 52 UMa, BD+45 1897, FK5 420, GC 15340, HD 96833, HIP 54539, HR 4335, SAO 43629, PPM 52277

Database references
| SIMBAD | data |

Psi Ursae Majoris (Psi UMa, ψ Ursae Majoris, ψ UMa) is a star in the northern circumpolar constellation of Ursa Major. It has an apparent visual magnitude of +3.01, making it a third magnitude star and one of the brighter members of the constellation. Parallax measurements place it at a distance of 140 light-years (43 parsecs) from Earth. This is sufficiently close that the magnitude of the star is only reduced by 0.05 due to extinction. In Chinese astronomy, Psi Ursae Majoris is called 太尊, Pinyin: Tàizūn, meaning Royals, because this star stands alone as the only member of the Royals asterism within the Purple Forbidden enclosure (see Chinese constellation). In R. H. Allen's Star Names, this was transliterated as Tien Tsan or Ta Tsun, meaning "Extremely Honorable".

The spectrum of this star matches a stellar classification of K1 III, with the luminosity class of 'III' indicating this is an evolved giant star that has exhausted the supply of hydrogen at its core. As a consequence, it has expanded to around 20 times the radius of the Sun. It is radiating roughly 140 times the luminosity of the Sun from its enlarged outer envelope at an effective temperature of 4,543 K. At this heat, the star glows with the orange hue of a K-type star.

Psi Ursae Majoris is a member of the thin disk population of the Milky Way. It is following an orbit through the galaxy with a low eccentricity of 0.02 that will carry it between 26.5–27.8 kly (8.1–8.5 kpc) from the Galactic Center. The low inclination of its orbit means the star will only stray 130 ly (40 pc) from the galactic plane.
