= HAT-P-13b =

Hot Jupiter orbiting HAT-P-13

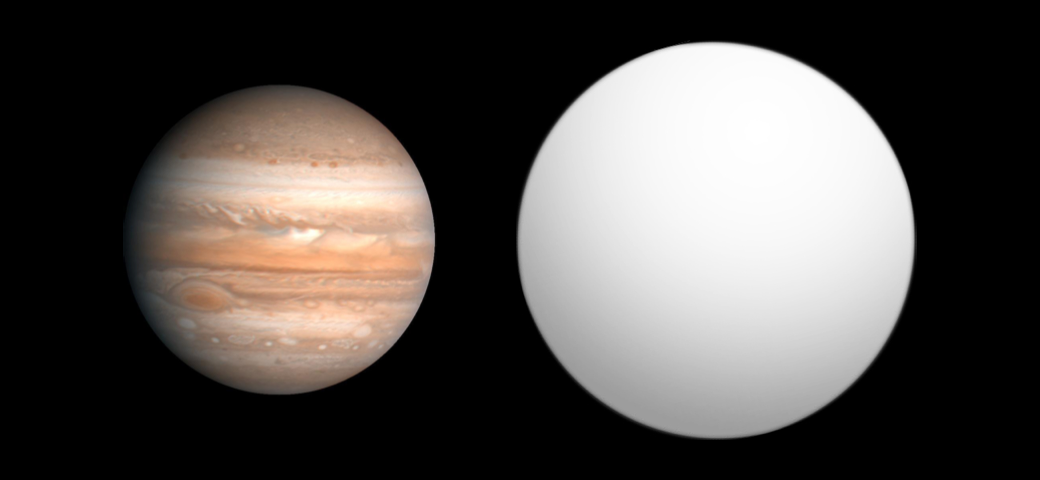
- Size comparison of HAT-P-13b with Jupiter.

Discovery
- Discovered by: Bakos et al.
- Discovery site: United States
- Discovery date: 21 July 2009
- Detection method: Transit; Radial velocity

Orbital characteristics
- Semi-major axis: 0.0426 AU (6,370,000 km)
- Eccentricity: 0.021
- Orbital period (sidereal): 2.91626 d
- Inclination: 83.4
- Argument of periastron: 181
- Star: HAT-P-13

Physical characteristics
- Mean radius: 1.28 R_{J}
- Mass: 0.851 M_{J}

HAT-P-13b is an extrasolar planet approximately 700 light-years away in the constellation Ursa Major. The planet was discovered when it transited across its sun, HAT-P-13. This planet is a hot Jupiter with 0.851 times the mass of Jupiter and 1.28 radius. The planet has a lower mass, but its overall size is larger than Jupiter.

The study in 2012, utilizing a Rossiter–McLaughlin effect, have determined the planetary orbit is probably aligned with the rotational axis of the star, misalignment equal to 1.9±8.6°.
