= Sigma Ursae Majoris =

Two star systems in Ursa Major

The Bayer designation σ Ursae Majoris (Sigma Ursae Majoris, σ UMa) is shared by two star systems in the constellation Ursa Major:

- σ^{1} (11 Ursae Majoris)
- σ^{2} (13 Ursae Majoris)

They are separated by 0.33° in the sky.

The two stars, Sigma^{1} and Sigma^{2} together, are considered an optical double star. They are not a binary star, in that they are not gravitationally linked, but they are close to each other as seen in the sky.
