= 84 Ursae Majoris =

Variable star in the constellation Ursa Major

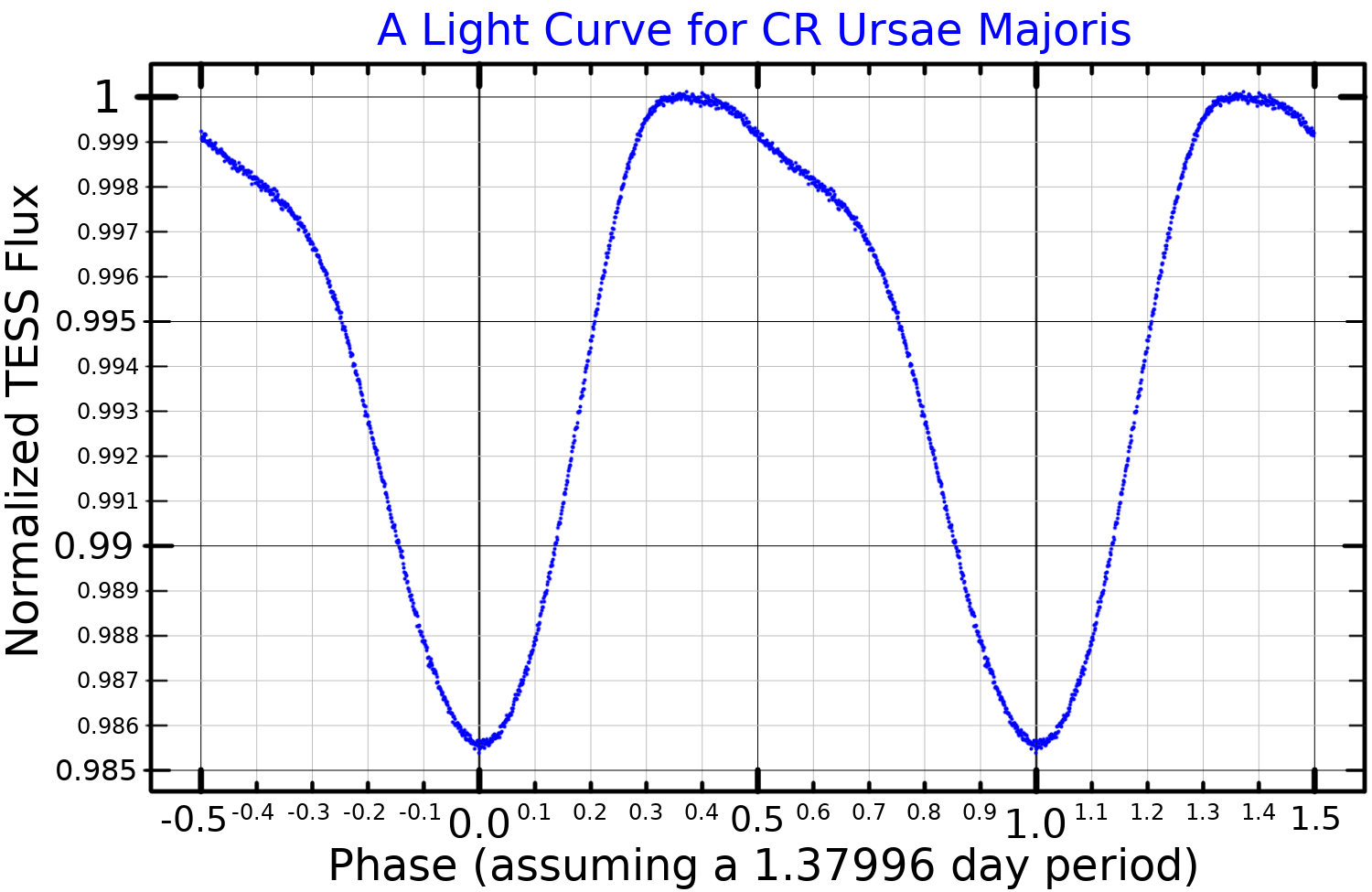
- A light curve for CR Ursae Majoris, plotted from TESS data.

Observation data Epoch J2000.0 Equinox ICRS
- Constellation: Ursa Major
- Right ascension: 13^{h} 46^{m} 35.65679^{s}
- Declination: +54° 25′ 57.6436″
- Apparent magnitude (V): 5.65 - 5.70

Characteristics
- Spectral type: B9pe
- B−V color index: −0.04
- Variable type: α^{2} CVn

Astrometry
Radial velocity (R_{v})	−2.4±1.6 km/s
Proper motion (μ)	RA: −18.559±0.041 mas/yr Dec.: −4.742±0.039 mas/yr
Parallax (π)	10.7417±0.0418 mas
Distance	304 ± 1 ly (93.1 ± 0.4 pc)
Absolute magnitude (M_{V})	0.98±0.12

Details

Primary
Mass	2.60+0.17 −0.25 M_{☉}
Radius	2.28±0.10 R_{☉}
Luminosity	44.9±4.3 L_{☉}
Surface gravity (log g)	4.07 cgs
Temperature	9865±370 K
Metallicity [Fe/H]	3.14±0.17 dex
Rotation	1.39 d
Age	0.24+0.15 −0.11 Gyr

Other designations
- CR Ursae Majoris, BD+55 1634, HIP 67231, HD 120198, HR 5187, SAO 28885

Database references
SIMBAD	data

84 Ursae Majoris, also known as HD 120198, is a star about 300 light years from the Earth, in the constellation Ursa Major. It is a 5th magnitude star, making it faintly visible to the naked eye of an observer far from city lights. It is an Ap star with an 1,100 gauss magnetic field, and an α^{2} CVn variable star, varying in brightness from magnitude 5.65 to 5.70, over a period of 1.37996 days. 84 Ursae Majoris is located just 70 arcseconds from the star LDS 2914, but that star is believed to be a background star not physically associated with 84 Ursae Majoris.

Gerhard Jackisch discovered that 84 Ursae Majoris is a variable star, with a period greater than one day, in 1972. It was given the variable star designation CR Ursae Majoris in 1974.

In 1994 John Rice and William Wehlau used Doppler imaging to map the distribution of iron and chromium on the surface of 84 Ursae Majoris. They found that the distribution of those elements across the surface was similar, and the abundances of those elements varied by a factor of 15 across the surface. Chromium was found to be about 600 times more abundant than on the Sun in the regions of the 84 Ursae Majoris surface with the minimum chromium abundance.

The size of 84 Ursae Majoris was measured in red light during 2015 and 2016, using the CHARA array. The limb darkened angular diameter was 0.226±0.008 milliarcseconds.
