= 56 Ursae Majoris =

Star in the constellation Ursa Major

Observation data Epoch J2000 Equinox ICRS
- Constellation: Ursa Major
- Right ascension: 11^{h} 22^{m} 49.58373^{s}
- Declination: +43° 28′ 57.7267″
- Apparent magnitude (V): 5.03

Characteristics
- Spectral type: G7IIIBa0.3
- U−B color index: +0.82
- B−V color index: +1.02

Astrometry
Radial velocity (R_{v})	1.01±0.05 km/s
Proper motion (μ)	RA: −35.561 mas/yr Dec.: −10.651 mas/yr
Parallax (π)	5.8813±0.0930 mas
Distance	555 ± 9 ly (170 ± 3 pc)

Orbit
Period (P)	16,911+438 −401 days
Semi-major axis (a)	22.9+1.0 −1.1 AU
Eccentricity (e)	0.562+0.012 −0.012
Inclination (i)	68+3.6 −3.4°
Longitude of the node (Ω)	60+3 −3°
Periastron epoch (T)	2468401+432 −385
Argument of periastron (ω) (secondary)	286+2.3 −2.3°

Details

56 UMa A
Mass	4.3±0.2 M_{☉}
Radius	21.16±0.86 R_{☉}
Surface gravity (log g)	2.30 cgs
Temperature	4,917±34 K
Metallicity [Fe/H]	0.05 dex

56 UMa B
Mass	1.31+0.11 −0.12 M_{☉}

Other designations
- BD+44°2083, FK5 2908, HD 98839, HIP 55560, HR 4392, SAO 43719

Database references
SIMBAD	data

56 Ursae Majoris (56 UMa) is a binary star in the constellation Ursa Major. At an apparent magnitude of 5.03, it is a faint star but visible to the naked eye depending on factors such as light pollution and eyesight. Parallax measurements derive a distance of 555 light-years.

It is a single-lined spectroscopic binary with an orbital period of about 45 years. The primary is an evolved giant star with a spectral class G7IIIBa0.3, a Barium star. The companion star is likely a heavy neutron star born by a supernova that exploded around 100,000 years ago.
