= C Ursae Majoris =

Spectroscopic binary star system in the constellation Ursa Major

c Ursae Majoris
Observation data Epoch J2000.0 Equinox ICRS
- Constellation: Ursa Major
- Right ascension: 09^{h} 14^{m} 20.542^{s}
- Declination: +61° 25′ 23.94″
- Apparent magnitude (V): 5.18

Characteristics
- Evolutionary stage: main sequence
- Spectral type: G0 V
- U−B color index: +0.08
- B−V color index: +0.605±0.003

Astrometry
Radial velocity (R_{v})	−14.3 km/s
Proper motion (μ)	RA: −7.826 mas/yr Dec.: −31.083 mas/yr
Parallax (π)	49.4145±0.1544 mas
Distance	66.0 ± 0.2 ly (20.24 ± 0.06 pc)
Absolute magnitude (M_{V})	3.75±0.06/8.2±0.6

Orbit
Period (P)	16.239631 ± 0.000015 d
Semi-major axis (a)	2.9±0.2 mas
Eccentricity (e)	0.10635±0.00054
Inclination (i)	106.0±12.0°
Longitude of the node (Ω)	107.0±14.0°
Periastron epoch (T)	2454358.214 ± 0.013 HJD
Argument of periastron (ω) (secondary)	137.18±0.29°
Semi-amplitude (K_{1}) (primary)	35.344±0.018 km/s
Semi-amplitude (K_{2}) (secondary)	64.97±0.27 km/s

Details

c UMa A
Mass	1.213 M_{☉}
Radius	2.6±0.1 R_{☉}
Surface gravity (log g)	3.98 cgs
Temperature	5,871 K
Metallicity [Fe/H]	−0.13 dex
Rotational velocity (v sin i)	5.59 km/s
Age	5.41 Gyr

c UMa B
Mass	0.59−0.66 M_{☉}
Radius	0.50±0.14 R_{☉}
Luminosity	0.08±0.04 L_{☉}

Other designations
- c UMa, 16 UMa, BD+62°1058, HD 79028, HIP 45333, HR 3648, SAO 14819

Database references
SIMBAD	data

c Ursae Majoris is the Bayer designation for a double-lined spectroscopic binary star system in the northern constellation of Ursa Major. It has an apparent visual magnitude of 5.18, which indicates that is visible to the naked eye. Parallax measurements yield an estimated distance of 66 light years from the Sun. The star is moving closer to the Earth with a heliocentric radial velocity of −14 km/s.

The spectroscopic binary nature of this system was among the first 75 such discovered by the Dominion Astrophysical Observatory in 1919. The pair orbit each other every 16.2 days with an eccentricity of 0.1. The semimajor axis of their orbit has an angle of around 2.9 mas, and the plane of the orbit is inclined to the line of sight at an angle of around 106°.

The primary component has a stellar classification of G0 V, suggesting that it is a G-type main sequence star similar to ι Per. It has a mass of about 1.2 times the mass of the Sun, and 2.6 times the Sun's radius. The magnitude difference between the two components is estimated to be 4.5±0.6. The estimated properties of the secondary indicate that it is most likely a K-type main sequence star. The system displays no indication of chromospheric activity.

The system has been examined for evidence of an infrared excess that could indicate the presence of a circumstellar debris disk, but none has been found. At present, c UMa is moving in Earth's direction with a radial velocity of −14.3 km/s. Perihelion passage will occur in 1.3 million years when the system comes within 10 ly (4 pc) of the Sun. This is most likely a member of the Milky Way's thin disk population of stars.
