= Pi Ursae Majoris =

Location of Pi^{1} and Pi^{2} Ursae Majoris (circled)

The Bayer designation Pi Ursae Majoris (π UMa, π Ursae Majoris) is shared by two stars in the constellation Ursa Major:

- Pi^{1} Ursae Majoris (3 Ursae Majoris)
- Pi^{2} Ursae Majoris (4 Ursae Majoris)

They are separated by 0.70° in the sky. They are sometimes given the name Muscida, which can also refer to ο Ursae Majoris.

The two stars, Pi^{1} and Pi^{2} together, are considered an optical double star. They are not a binary star, in that they are not gravitationally linked, but they are close to each other as seen in the sky, and so are optically associated.
