= Inuit astronomy =

Inuit beliefs about the celestial sphere or Qilak

Tukturjuit, meaning the “caribou". Known as the Big Dipper in western astronomy.

Inuit astronomy is centered around the Qilak, the Inuit name for the celestial sphere and the home for souls of departed people. Inuit beliefs about astronomy are shaped by the harsh climate in the Arctic and the resulting difficulties of surviving and hunting in the region. The stars were an important tool to track time, seasons, and location, particularly during winter.

The Inuit are a group of circumpolar peoples who inhabit the Arctic and subarctic regions of Canada and Alaska (North America), Greenland/KalaallitNunaat (Denmark) and parts of northern Siberia (Russia). There are many similarities between the traditions and beliefs among the indigenous peoples in Arctic regions. For example, the Inuit, Chukchi and Evenks all have a worldview based on their religious beliefs and have related traditions about astronomy. While differing traditions exist among groups, they overlap in the way the stars, weather, and folk tales assist in hunting, navigation and teaching their young about the world.

Their astronomy and relationship to the sky is heavily influenced by their spiritual and pragmatic needs, as well as the high northerly latitudes where they reside. For those living above the Arctic Circle, the latitude affects the view of the night sky, especially the fact that during winter polar night may occur for multiple months and the midnight sun during summer.

== Impact of high north latitude ==
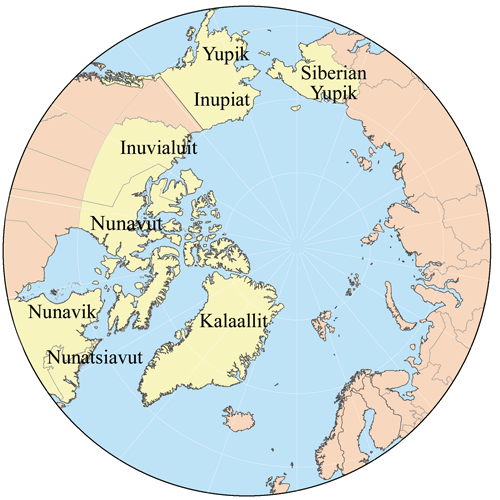
Inuit Circumpolar Conference members

=== Polar night and midnight sun ===
The latitudes within the Arctic Circle significantly influence both the behavior of the sun and the ability to see stars. Starting at approximately the end of November to mid-January, at around the 69th parallel north, the Inuit never see the sun. During this time, though dark, the sky is often obscured by weather conditions like blowing snow or cloud cover. Then, for 10 weeks beginning in mid-May, the sun never sets. This also means that in the spring, summer, and early fall, the skies are too bright to visibly see stars. These phenomenons and limitations have had a significant influence on Inuit relationships to the Sun and stars.

=== Atmospheric refraction ===
The latitude also means that some stars are not visible at all, while those that are visible, but near the horizon, are visibly affected by atmospheric refraction because of the low temperatures. The appearance of these stars near the horizon changes throughout the day and during "dark days of winter without sunrise, the stars signal the time for villagers to wake up, for children and hunters to begin their days, and for the village to start the routines of the day."

Refraction also affects the appearance of the Sun, in particular when it first re-appears on the horizon after the long, dark winter. This was a time of great anxiety, so the Inuit observed strict taboos "to ensure the sun's rapid and full return." The Sun was not believed to be safely and securely back until it reached a height in the sky roughly equivalent to the width of a mitten on an outstretched hand. Only at this point would longer dog-team journeys be taken and the preparations for moving to spring camps begin.

=== Time telling ===
Inuit use the Moon to keep track of the 'calendar year', counting thirteen "moon months." Each month is named for a predictable seasonal characteristic, mostly related to animal behavior, which coincide with a particular moon. For example, one month is called "the nesting of eider ducks" while another is called "the birth of seal pups." The moon month during the polar night is referred to as tauvijjuaq or the "great darkness."

Observing the winter solstice was very important, though the equinoxes and summer solstice were not given much attention. Winter solstice marks both the darkest part of winter and the turning point when light begins to increase, marking the promise of the Sun's return. The first appearance of Aagjuuk happens around mid-December and is used across the Arctic to signal winter solstice's arrival. For some tribes, this would also signal the time for a midwinter celebration.

Some constellations have only seasonal appearances, which help mark the passage of time. For example, Ullakut (Orion) and Sakiattiak (Taurus) are only visible in the winter. Throughout winter, many stars within Tukturjuit (Big Dipper) were used as hour hands to keep track of time during the night or as calendar stars to determine the date. Aagjuuk (Aquila) and Kingulliq (Lyra) begin to appear near the end of winter, signaling that light will be returning to the region.

== Spiritual cosmology ==
Inuit tradition closely links the Earth and sky, with a spatial understanding of the Earth as a large flat disk ending in cliffs and surrounded by sky. The sky itself is understood as four to five layers of celestial realms. Each layer is a separate land of the dead and its own world. The aurora borealis bears special significance as the place where spirits who died from blood loss, murder, or childbirth dwell. Legends warn Inuit against wrongdoing and taboo acts by telling the stories of people being transformed into stars after committing transgressions. For example, "the ubiquitous Inuit epic in which greed, murder, incest, and retribution account for the creation of the sun, moon, and the first stars."

== Constellations ==
The Inuit have traditional names for many constellations, asterisms, and stars. Inuit astronomy names thirty-three individual stars, two star clusters, and one nebula. The stars are incorporated into 16 or 17 asterisms, though seven stand alone with individual names.

Distinctively, the star Polaris or the North Star is a minor one for the Inuit, possibly because at northern latitudes its location is too high in the sky to be useful for navigation. It is called Nuutuittuq, which means "never moves." It is only used for navigation by the southernmost Inuit.

=== Naming ===
Naming practices fall into two main categories: human or animal personification and "intrinsic" designation, drawing from a particular visible feature of the star(s). Intrinsic designation might be based on color, distance to surrounding stars, and movement or progression across the sky. Many stars have two names, an everyday name and "literary" name which would be used when stars personify a mythic character. The stars never collectively make the image of an animal or person because of the belief that each individual star was once an animate being living on Earth. Inanimate objects like the soapstone "lamp-stand" or "collar-bones" are represented by groupings of stars.

=== Mythology ===
The names of the stars are recalled through myths and legends, which "reflected social ethics and universal concerns about creation, social and cosmic order, nourishment, retribution, and renewal." These stories are both used as explanations for the way things are or came to be and as a narrative tool to help people remember the location of stars and their relationship to each other, crucial when using the stars for navigation or time telling.

Table of constellations, asterisms, and principle stars
Constellation or asterism name	Translation	Related western constellation	Principal stars of the Inuit	Related traditions or legends
Aagjuuk		Aquila	Altair, Tarazed	Used to mark daytime and coming of spring.
Akuttujuuk	Two placed far apart or those [two] apart	Orion	Betelgeuse, Bellatrix (top two stars of "shoulders" of Orion	Indicator of the change of seasons. Sources conflict on if their appearance marks the beginning or end of winter.
Aviguti	Divider, separator or that which divides [the sky]	Milky Way		One story says that Aviguti is the track left "by Raven's snowshoe when he walked across the sky creating the inhabitants of the Earth".
Kingulliq*	The one behind	Lyra	The Old Woman (Vega)	Vega is also known in some legends as "a brother of the Sun" since it is the second star visible during the beginning of spring.
Kingulliq*(second)	The one behind	Orion	Rigel (right "foot" of Orion)	Kingulliq is known as a hunter, who is trailing behind Ullakut or "the runners" (three Orion's belt stars) because he dropped his glove.
Nanurjuk*	Like or having the spirit of a polar bear	Taurus	Aldebaran	Many tales where Nanurjuk is a polar bear being hunted by the nearby stars surrounding it.
Nuutuittuq* (alternate spelling: Niqirtsuituq)	Never moves	Ursa Minor	Polaris	Nuutuittuq is a minor star and cannot be used for navigation by most Inuit. Depicted on the flag and coat of arms of the Canadian territory of Nunavut.
Pituaq	The lamp-stand	Cassiopeia	Scadar, Caph	
Qimmiit	Dogs	Taurus	Hyades (star cluster)	In one legend, Qimmiit (the star cluster of Hyades) are dogs who have cornered a polar bear, Nanurjuk (Aldebaran).
Quturjuuk	Collar bones	Gemini and Auriga	Pollux / Castor and Capella / Menkalinan	Used to keep time throughout the night. Each pair of stars denotes a bone each of the collar bone.
Sakiattiak	Breast bone	Taurus	Pleiades (star cluster)	Sometimes believed to be either dogs or hunters
Sikuliarsiujuittuq*	The one who never goes onto the newly formed sea-ice or murdered man	Canis Minor	Procyon	In legends, referred to as "a large man who went hunting". Other legends refer to the man as the one who stole food from fellow village hunters because he was too obese to hunt on ice. He was then killed by the other hunters who convinced him to go on the sea ice anyway. The color of Procyon can often appear red and this color was associated with his bloody end.
Singuuriq*	Flickering or it pulsates	Canis Major	Sirius	The star is located very low on the horizon at northern latitudes. Might be named "flickering" because of atmospheric refraction.
Sivulliik	The first ones or those [two] in front	Boötes	Artcturus, Muphrid	Called "the first ones" because this pair of stars because they mark the beginning of winter.
Tukturjuit	Caribou (pl.)	Ursa Major	Dubhe, Merak, Phecda, Megrez, Alioth, Mizar-Alcor, and Alkaid	Made up of the same seven stars which are referred to collectively as the Big Dipper
Ullaktut	The runners	Orion's Belt	Alnitak, Alnilam, Mintaka	Ullakut represents "three heroic runners" chasing down their prey.
Ursuutaattiaq	Seal-skin oil or blubber container	Cassiopeia	Same stars as in western Cassiopeia	
Qangiamariit	Nephews and nieces or cousins	Orion Nebula		Qangiamariit is "thought to be a group of children".

*Asterisks mark names of principle stars, not full constellations or asterisms.
