= Orchard Hill Observatory =

Observatory at the University of Massachusetts Amherst

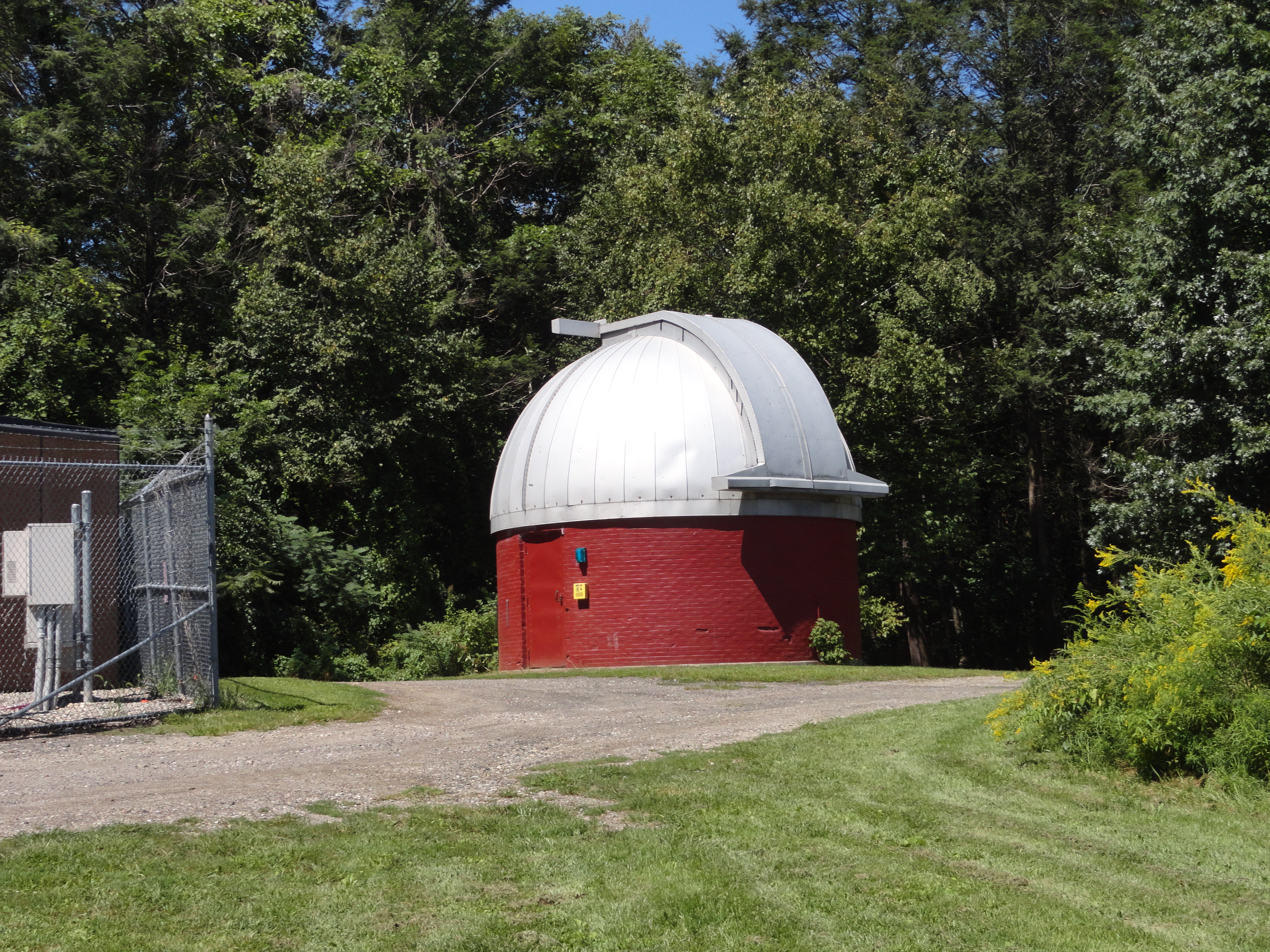
- Orchard Hill Observatory, circa 2011
- Organization: University of Massachusetts Amherst
- Location: Amherst, Massachusetts, United States
- Coordinates: 42°23′38.62″N 72°31′17.63″W
- Altitude: 413 ft (126 m)
- Weather: Amherst Weather
- Established: 1965
- Website: Orchard Hill Observatory

Telescopes
- Group 128 Inc. X16 Cassegrain reflector
- Related media on Commons

The Orchard Hill Observatory is an astronomical observatory located at the highest point on the University of Massachusetts Amherst campus. Constructed in 1965, the observatory is a red brick building with a 16-inch Cassegrain reflector optical telescope. It is used for several community events.

== History ==
Originally, the observatory was home to a 20" telescope, given to the department by an avid amateur who lived in central Massachusetts. It was a 1/10 scale model (loosely) of a larger 200" scope. Eventually, a crack was spotted during one of the re-aluminizings of the 20" mirror, and the scope was decommissioned. In the meantime, the department had been granted money—associated with its move from Hasbrouck to the Graduate Research Tower—to buy a small telescope and install it on top of the GRC. The GRC had a small "isolation" pad built onto its roof, which was supposed to be a mount for the scope, accessible via a small open elevator. However, the GRC had terrible noise and gross vibration problems. The isolation pad never worked, and there were too many safety concerns about using the roof of the building for observing.

A 16" telescope was later bought from Competition Associates, a racing car company. That scope arrived in 1976, but it was never mounted onto the roof of the GRC due to the aforementioned problems. Instead, it was stored in the basement of Hasbrouck for several years, becoming known as the "Subterranean Telescope". This situation finally led to the 20" being disassembled and the 16" scope being moved to Orchard Hill and installed in the dome before the fall of 1984, according to Andrew Cassidy, an astronomy undergraduate who was provided a copy of the keys for low-magnification observations. The 16" was a major improvement in usability. At present, the 20" may still be stored in the Astronomy Research Facility, but the drive was most likely not kept.

Special thanks to Professor Thomas Arny for much of the recent history of the facility.

== Hours ==
The observatory does not currently have a regular schedule. It was regularly open for public viewing on Thursday nights until at least 2011.

The Five College Astronomy Club, consisting of students belonging to the Five Colleges, utilizes the observatory to host observing nights on clear nights.

== Administration ==
The observatory does not receive any external funding. It is part of the College of Natural Sciences/Astronomy, maintained and operated by the UMass Astronomy Department and supported by members of the Five College Astronomy Club.

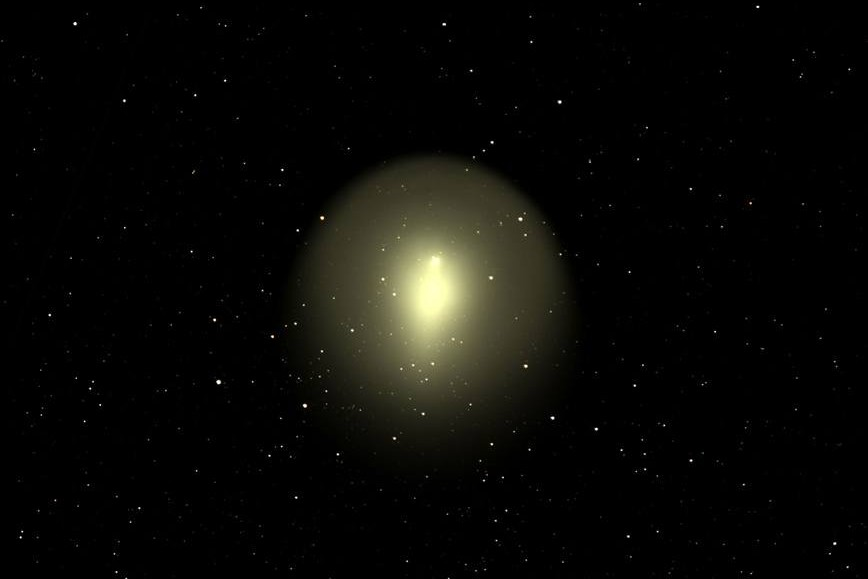
This image of Comet Holmes was taken from Orchard Hill Observatory.

== Observations ==
It is possible to see a variety of astronomical bodies at the observatory. Members of the observatory keep a log online of what they have observed. Some things that have been logged are the double star Albireo, the Andromeda Galaxy, a dense patch of stars in the Milky Way near Cygnus, Jupiter with the Galilean moons, the waxing gibbous Moon, Mars, and Alcor and Mizar.

== See also ==
- List of astronomical observatories
- List of radio telescopes
