= Alcor =

Alcor may refer to:

- Alcor (star), also known as 80 Ursae Majoris, a star in Ursa Major very close to Mizar
- Alcor (rocket engine), also known as Zebra or 30-KS-8000, a US Air Force engine used 1960–1977
- Alcor Life Extension Foundation, a foundation that advocates for, researches, and performs cryonics
- Alcor sailplane, a high altitude pressurized sailplane developed by aeronautical engineer Robert Lamson
- ALCOR, a programming language
- French name of the anime and manga hero Koji Kabuto

== See also ==
- USS Alcor
