= Stella Ludoviciana =

Star in the constellation Ursa Major

- Location of Stella Ludoviciana (circled)

Observation data Epoch J2000.0 Equinox ICRS
- Constellation: Ursa Major
- Right ascension: 13^{h} 24^{m} 51.8521^{s}
- Declination: +54° 53′ 50.841″
- Apparent magnitude (V): +7.58

Characteristics
- Evolutionary stage: main sequence
- Spectral type: A5-F0

Astrometry
| Radial velocity (R_{v}) | −3.42±0.35 km/s |
| Proper motion (μ) | RA: −20.171 mas/yr Dec.: −5.330 mas/yr |
| Parallax (π) | 10.9650±0.0281 mas |
| Distance | 297.5 ± 0.8 ly (91.2 ± 0.2 pc) |

Details
| Mass | 1.5 M_{☉} |
| Radius | 1.6 R_{☉} |
| Luminosity | 6.2 L_{☉} |
| Surface gravity (log g) | 4.13 cgs |
| Temperature | 7,223 K |
| Age | 961 Myr |

Other designations
- Stella Ludoviciana, BD+55°1602, GC 18150, HD 116798, SAO 28748, TYC 3850-257-1, 2MASS J13245185+5453509

Database references
| SIMBAD | data |

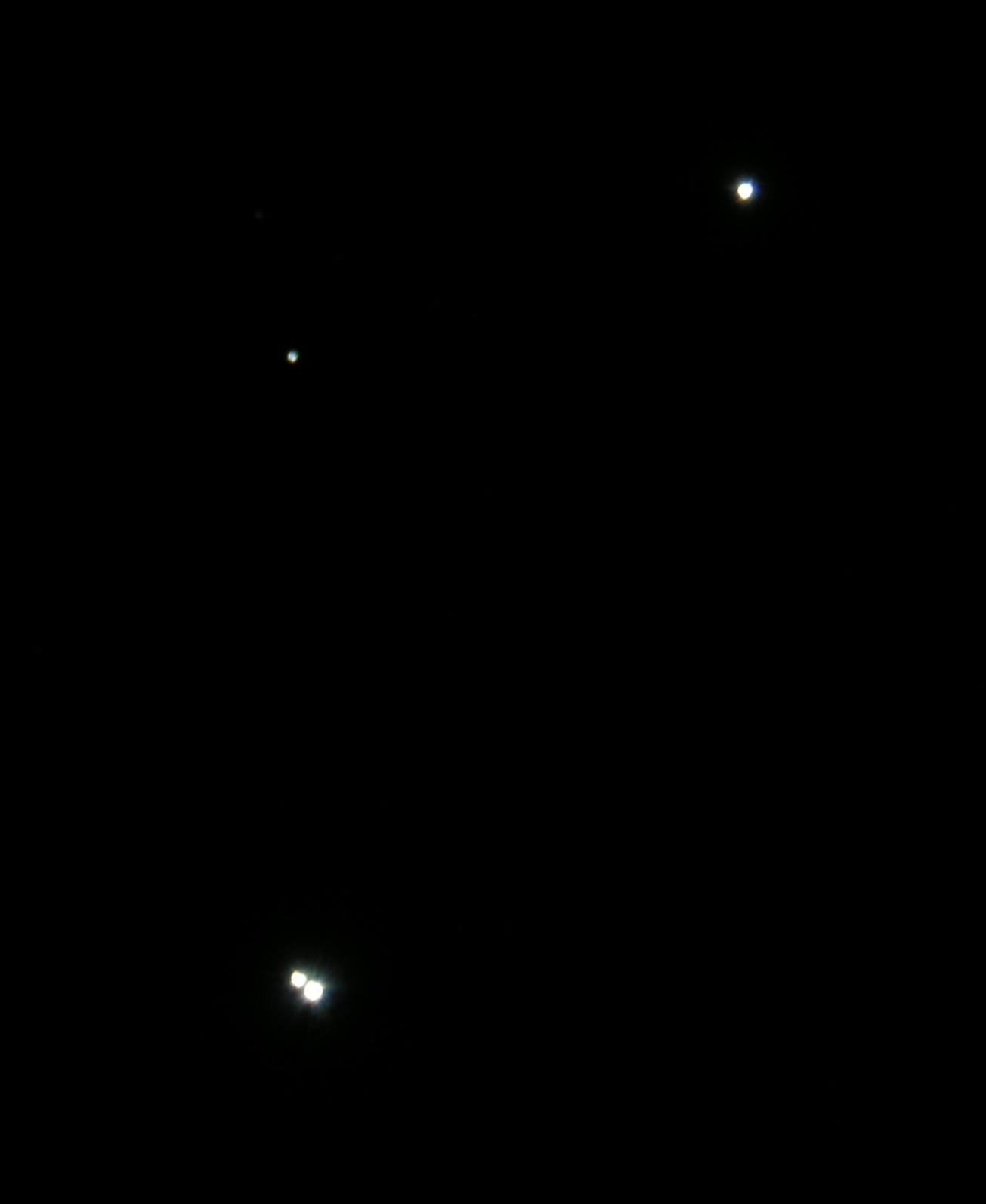
Stella Ludoviciana between the brighter Mizar and Alcor (north is towards the right)

Stella Ludoviciana, also known as HD 116798, is an 8th-magnitude star in the asterism of the Big Dipper in the constellation Ursa Major, halfway between Mizar and Alcor. A line-of-sight companion with Mizar and Alcor (with a spectral type similar to the latter), it is roughly four times more distant. It has the spectral type A8/F0 III. That spectral class suggests it is a giant star, but evolutionary models place it on the main sequence.

The star was observed on 2 December 1722 by Johann Georg Liebknecht, who mistook it for a planet and named it after Louis V, Landgrave of Hesse-Darmstadt. Unknown to Liebknecht, it had been previously observed by Benedetto Castelli in 1616. In different sources the name may be written as "Sidus Ludovicianum", "Sidus Ludoviciana", or "Stella Ludoviciana". The name Stella Ludoviciana was officially approved by the IAU Working Group on Star Names on 17 April 2026.

The star is six times more luminous than the Sun, 1.6 times its radius, and has a surface temperature of 7,200 K. Spectral classification based on a spectrum taken for radial velocity measurement tentatively determined a spectral and luminosity class of A8/F0III, which would indicate that it has exhausted its core hydrogen and started to evolve away from the main sequence, however giant stars of this type should be at least ten times more luminous than measured for Stella Ludoviciana. It shows evidence of Gamma Doradus pulsations, and is a likely member of a young stellar association known as Group-X.
