= Alcor (star) =

Binary star in the constellation Ursa Major

- Location of Alcor (Mizar is circled, Alcor is invisible beside it at this scale.)

Observation data Epoch J2000.0 Equinox ICRS
- Constellation: Ursa Major
- Right ascension: 13^{h} 25^{m} 13.53783^{s}
- Declination: +54° 59′ 16.6548″
- Apparent magnitude (V): +3.99

Characteristics
- Spectral type: A5Vn / M3-4

Astrometry
Radial velocity (R_{v})	−9.6 km/s
Proper motion (μ)	RA: +120.21 mas/yr Dec.: −16.04 mas/yr
Parallax (π)	39.91±0.13 mas
Distance	81.7 ± 0.3 ly (25.06 ± 0.08 pc)
Absolute magnitude (M_{V})	+2.00

Details

Alcor A
Mass	1.842+0.027 −0.031 M_{☉}
Radius	2.002+0.068 −0.067 (equatorial); 1.723±0.050 (polar) R_{☉}
Luminosity	13.98±0.75 L_{☉}
Surface gravity (log g)	4.25 cgs
Temperature	7,556+109 −123 (equator); 8,985+116 −124 (polar) K
Rotational velocity (v sin i)	239+10 −13 km/s
Age	422+67 −75 Myr

Alcor B
Mass	0.25 M_{☉}
Age	500±100 Myr

Other designations
- g Ursae Majoris, 80 Ursae Majoris, BD+55 1603, CCDM J13240+5456D, GC 18155, HD 116842, HIP 65477, HR 5062, PPM 34021, SAO 28751, WDS J13239+5456C

Database references
SIMBAD	data

Alcor (/ˈælkɔːr/) is a binary star system in the constellation of Ursa Major. It is the fainter companion of Mizar, the two stars forming a naked eye double in the handle of the Big Dipper (or Plough) asterism in Ursa Major. The two lie about 83 light-years away from the Sun, as measured by the Hipparcos astrometry satellite.

== Nomenclature ==
Alcor has the Flamsteed designation 80 Ursae Majoris. Alcor derives from Arabic الخوار al-khawāri, meaning 'faint one'; notable as a faintly perceptible companion of Mizar.

In 2016, the International Astronomical Union organized a Working Group on Star Names (WGSN) to catalog and standardize proper names for stars. The WGSN's first bulletin of July 2016 included a table of the first two batches of names approved by the WGSN; which included Alcor for 80 UMa.

== Mizar and Alcor ==
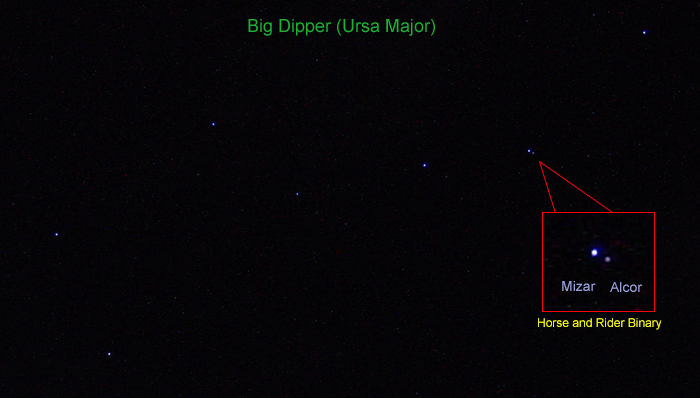
Mizar and Alcor in constellation Ursa Major.

With normal eyesight magnitude 3.99 Alcor (spectral class A5V) appears at about 12 minutes of arc from the second-magnitude star Mizar.

Mizar's and Alcor's proper motions show they move together, along with most of the other stars of the Big Dipper except Dubhe and Alkaid, as members of the Ursa Major Moving Group, a mostly dispersed group of stars sharing a common birth. However, it has yet to be demonstrated conclusively that they are gravitationally bound. Recent studies indicate that Alcor and Mizar are somewhat closer together than previously thought: approximately 74,000 ± 39,000 AU, or 0.5–1.5 light-years. The uncertainty is due to our uncertainty about the exact distances from us. If they are exactly the same distance from us (somewhat unlikely) then the distance between them is only 17,800 AU (0.281 light-years).

== Alcor B ==
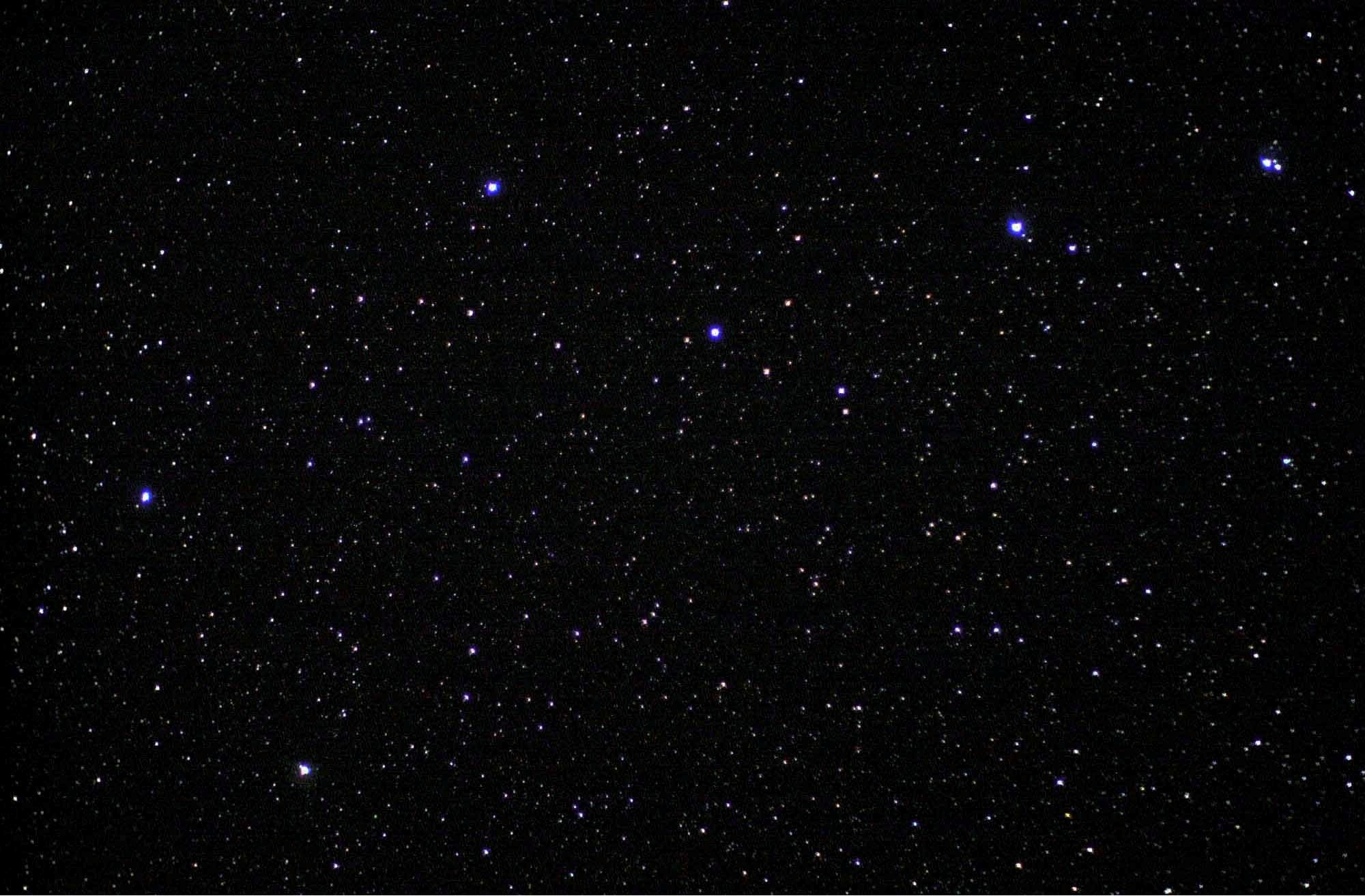
The Big Dipper's bowl and part of the handle photographed from the International Space Station. Mizar and Alcor are at the upper right.

In 2009, Alcor was discovered to have a companion star Alcor B, a magnitude 8.8 red dwarf.

Alcor B was discovered independently by two groups. One group led by Eric Mamajek (University of Rochester) and colleagues at Steward Observatory University of Arizona used adaptive optics on the 6.5-meter telescope at MMT Observatory. Another led by Neil Zimmerman, a graduate student at Columbia University and member of Project 1640, an international collaborative team that includes astrophysicists at the American Museum of Natural History, the University of Cambridge's Institute of Astronomy, the California Institute of Technology, and NASA's Jet Propulsion Laboratory, used the 5-meter Hale Telescope at Palomar Observatory.

Alcor B is one second of arc away from Alcor A. Its spectral type is M3-4 and it is a main-sequence star, a red dwarf.

Alcor A and B are situated 1.2 light-years away from, and are co-moving with, the Mizar quadruple system, making the system the second-closest stellar sextuplet—only Castor is closer. The Mizar–Alcor stellar sextuple system belongs to the Ursa Major Moving Group, a stellar group of stars of similar ages and velocities, and the closest cluster-like object to Earth.

== Other names ==
In Arabic, Alcor is also known as Al-Sahja (the rhythmical form of the usual al-Suhā) meaning "forgotten", "lost", or "neglected".

In traditional Indian astronomy, Alcor is known as Arundhati, wife of one of the Saptarishi.

In the Miꞌkmaq myth of the great bear and the seven hunters, Mizar is Chickadee and Alcor is his cooking pot.

== Military namesakes ==
USS Alcor (AD-34) and USS Alcor (AK-259) are both United States Navy ships.
