= The Wain =

The Wain may refer to

- The Great Wain or Charles's Wain, another name for the Big Dipper asterism
- The Lesser Wain, another name for the Little Dipper asterism
