= Mizar and Alcor =

Binary stars in the Big Dipper asterism

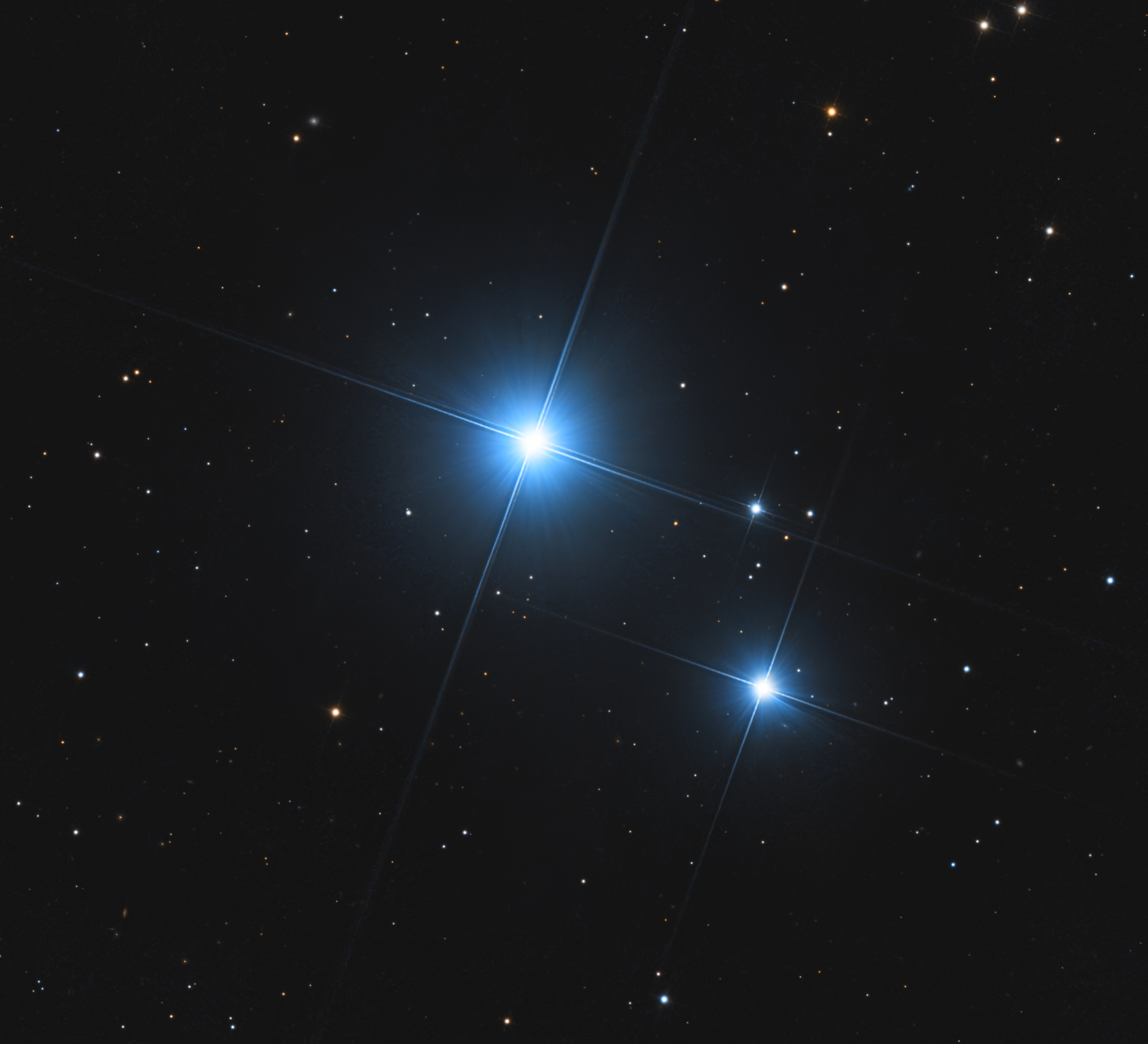
Mizar (upper center) and Alcor (lower right) (north is down)

Mizar and Alcor are two stars forming a naked eye double in the handle of the Big Dipper (or Plough) asterism in the constellation of Ursa Major. Their magnitudes are 2.2 and 3.9, and the pair can easily be seen without the aid of a telescope. Mizar and its fainter companion Alcor are actually a senary system consisting of two pairs of double stars, one of which is itself a double binary system. The six stars are gravitationally bound to each other. The traditional name Mizar derives from the Arabic المئزر or mi'zar, meaning 'apron; wrapper, cover'. Alcor was originally the Arabic سها or suhā/sohā, meaning either 'the forgotten' or 'neglected one'. The Arabs and the ancient Persians used distinguishing Mizar and Alcor as a test of vision.

Mizar, also designated Zeta Ursae Majoris (ζ Ursae Majoris, abbreviated Zeta UMa, ζ UMa), is itself a quadruple system and Alcor, also designated 80 Ursae Majoris (80 UMa), is a binary star, the pair together forming a sextuple system. Mizar was the first known binary star system, claimed to be discovered by Italian astronomer Giovanni Battista Riccioli in 1650. The whole system lies about 83 light-years away from the Sun, as measured by the Hipparcos astrometry satellite.

== Appearance ==
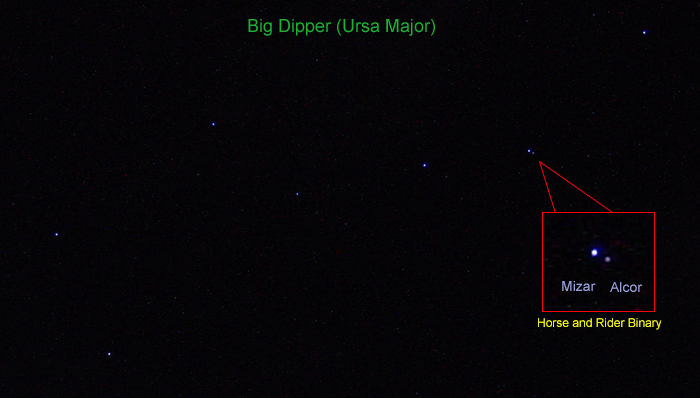
Mizar and Alcor in constellation Ursa Major

With normal eyesight Alcor appears at about 12 arcminutes from Mizar. Alcor is of magnitude 3.99 and spectral class A5V. It has a faint red dwarf companion separated by 1 arcsecond.

== Stellar system ==
Mizar and Alcor's proper motions show they move together, along with most of the other stars of the Big Dipper except Alpha Ursae Majoris and Eta Ursae Majoris, as members of the Ursa Major moving group, a mostly dispersed group of stars sharing a common birth. Parallax measurements by Hipparcos satellite indicate that Alcor and Mizar are somewhat closer together than previously thought: 0.36±0.19 pc. The uncertainty is due to not knowing exactly how far away the stars are. If they are exactly the same distance from us then the distance between them is only 17800 AU (0.281 ly). As Mizar is a quadruple and Alcor is a binary, the combined system would consist of six stars, being the second-closest known six-star system after Castor. The systems have been assigned a 100% probability of being gravitationally bound, as of 2011.

Between Mizar and Alcor, the 8th-magnitude star Sidus Ludovicianum is a distant background object.

Benedetto Castelli, one of Galileo's colleagues in the 17th century, observed Mizar through a telescope and realized that it was a binary system: Mizar A and Mizar B. Then, throughout the 19th century and the beginning of the 20th century, with the help of spectroscopy, scientists showed that Mizar A and B were both binary systems. In 1908, the Alcor-Mizar system was the first apparent five-star system ever discovered.

In 2009, Eric Mamajek and his colleagues from the University of Rochester, while searching for exoplanets, discovered that Alcor was also a binary system, making Alcor and Mizar a six-star system. The same conclusion was independently found by Ben Oppenheimer from the American Natural History Museum.

== Other names ==
Mizar is known as Vasishtha, one of the Saptarishi, and Alcor as Arundhati, wife of Vasishtha, in Indian astronomy. As a married couple, they are considered to symbolize marriage and in some Hindu communities to this day priests conducting a wedding ceremony allude to or point out the asterism as a symbol of the closeness marriage brings to a couple.

Although the statement has been made that Alcor was not known to the Ancient Greeks, there is a story that it was the lost Pleiad Electra, which had wandered there from her companions and became Alopex, the Fox. A Latin title was Eques Stellula, the 'Little Starry Horseman'; Eques, the 'Cavalier', is from the 17th-century German astronomer Bayer. Mizar and Alcor together are sometimes called the Horse and Rider (and popularly, in England, Jack on the Middle Horse), with Mizar being the horse. The Persian astronomer Al Biruni (973–1048 AD) mentioned its importance in the family life of the Arabs on the 18th day of the Syrian month of Adar, the March equinox; and a modern Persian story makes it the infant of the wālida ('mother') among the three mourners: Alioth, Mizar, and Alkaid).

Chinese Taoism personifies Mizar as the Lu star. Mizar and Alcor, termed the "horse and rider" by the Arabians, are a good test of minimal vision.

In Chinese, 北斗 (Běi Dǒu), meaning 'Northern Dipper', refers to an asterism consisting of Zeta Ursae Majoris, Alpha Ursae Majoris, Beta Ursae Majoris, Gamma Ursae Majoris, Delta Ursae Majoris, Epsilon Ursae Majoris and Eta Ursae Majoris. Consequently, Zeta Ursae Majoris itself is known as 北斗六 Běi Dǒu liù, (English: the Sixth Star of Northern Dipper) and 開陽 Kāi Yáng, (English: Star of The Opener of Heat).

Mizar is Chickadee and Alcor is his cooking pot in the Mi'kmaq myth of the great bear and the seven hunters.

== Test of eyesight ==
The ability to resolve Mizar and Alcor with the naked eye is often quoted as a test of eyesight and that has been confirmed by modern experimental research. Arabic literature says that only those with the sharpest eyesight can see the companion of Mizar. The 14th century Arabian lexicographer Firuzabadi called it "Our Riddle", while the 13th century Persian astronomical writer Zakariya al-Qazwini said that "people tested their eyesight by this star." In Japan, Alcor is sometimes referred to as the Lifespan Star (Jumyōboshi; 寿命星); it was rumoured that being unable to see Alcor with the naked eye was a sign of impending death from old age.

Humboldt wrote of it as being seen with difficulty, and Arago similarly alluded to it. Astronomer Patrick Moore suggested that this in fact refers to another star that lies visually between Mizar and Alcor. This star is occasionally known as "Ludwig's Star", because it was observed on 2 December 1722 by the German astronomer Johann Georg Liebknecht and named in honour of his patron the Landgrave Ludwig of Hessen-Darmstadt. Liebknecht thought it was a planet, but it had already been observed in exactly the same position by Benedetto Castelli approximately a century earlier, which indicated it was a background star.

Agnes M. Clerke wrote:

The Arabs in the desert regarded it as a test of penetrating vision; and they were accustomed to oppose "Sohail" to "Soha" (Canopus to Alcor) as occupying respectively the highest and lowest posts in the celestial hierarchy. So that Vidit Alcor, at non lunam plenam (Latin for "he saw Alcor, but not the full moon"), came to be a proverbial description of one keenly alive to trifles, but dull of apprehension for broad facts.

== See also ==
- Star system
