= USS Alkaid =

Liberty ship of WWII

History

United States
- Name: William G. Sumner
- Namesake: William G. Sumner
- Owner: War Shipping Administration (WSA)
- Ordered: as type (EC2-S-C1) hull, MC hull 1211
- Builder: St. Johns River Shipbuilding Company, Jacksonville, Florida
- Cost: $1,438,116
- Yard number: 19
- Way number: 1
- Laid down: 13 September 1943
- Launched: 8 November 1943
- Sponsored by: Mrs. William R. McQuaid
- Completed: 19 November 1943
- Identification: Call sign: KUJT
- Fate: Transferred to US Navy, 19 November 1943

United States
- Name: Alkaid
- Namesake: The star Alkaid
- Acquired: 19 November 1943
- Commissioned: 27 March 1944
- Decommissioned: 11 March 1946
- Stricken: 28 March 1946
- Identification: Hull symbol: AK-114; Call sign: NTNQ
- Fate: Laid up in the, Suisun Bay Reserve Fleet, Suisun Bay, California, 15 June 1946; Sold for scrapping, 4 March 1947, removed from fleet, 12 March 1947
- Notes: Name reverted to William G. Sumner when laid up in Reserve Fleet

General characteristics
- Class & type: Crater-class cargo ship
- Displacement: 4,023 long tons (4,088 t) (standard); 14,550 long tons (14,780 t) (full load)
- Length: 441 ft 6 in (134.57 m)
- Beam: 56 ft 11 in (17.35 m)
- Draft: 28 ft 4 in (8.64 m)
- Installed power: 2 × Oil fired 450 °F (232 °C) boilers, operating at 220 psi (1,500 kPa) , (manufactured by Combustion Engineering); 2,500 shp (1,900 kW)
- Propulsion: 1 × Vertical triple-expansion reciprocating steam engine, (manufactured by General Machinery Corp., Hamilton, Ohio); 1 × screw propeller
- Speed: 12.5 kn (23.2 km/h; 14.4 mph)
- Capacity: 7,800 t (7,700 long tons) DWT; 444,206 cu ft (12,578.5 m^{3}) (non-refrigerated)
- Complement: 206
- Armament: 1 × 5 in (130 mm)/38-caliber dual-purpose gun; 4 × 40 mm (1.6 in) 40 mm Bofors anti-aircraft gun mounts; 6 × 20 mm (0.79 in) Oerlikon cannons anti-aircraft gun mounts

USS Alkaid (AK-114) was a Crater-class cargo ship, converted from a Liberty Ship, commissioned by the US Navy for service in World War II. She was first named after William G. Sumner, a classical liberal American social scientist. She was renamed and commissioned after Alkaid, a star in the Big Dipper asterism or constellation Ursa Major. She was responsible for delivering troops, goods and equipment to locations in the war zone.

== Construction ==
William G. Sumner was laid down on 13 September 1943, under a Maritime Commission (MARCOM) contract, MC hull 1211, by the St. Johns River Shipbuilding Company, Jacksonville, Florida; she was sponsored by Mrs. William R. McQuaid, a prominent citizen of Jacksonville, and launched on 8 November 1943. She was acquired by the US Navy, under a bareboat charter on 19 November 1943, and renamed Alkaid. She was converted for naval service by the Gibbs Gas Engine Co., Jacksonville, and commissioned in Jacksonville, on 27 March 1944.

== Service history ==
Following a period of shakedown training off the US East Coast, Alkaid sailed on 6 May 1944, for the Pacific Ocean, via Guantanamo Bay, Cuba, and the Panama Canal. On 14 June, the ship touched at Espiritu Santo and reported to Service Squadron 8 for duty.

For the duration of her World War II service, Alkaid acted as an interisland transport. Some of the ports she visited included Noumea, New Caledonia; Guadalcanal; Tulagi; Suva, Fiji; Auckland and Wellington, New Zealand; Efate, New Hebrides; Oro Bay, New Guinea; Iwo Jima; Guam; and Eniwetok.

On 15 May 1945, Alkaid sailed from Ulithi, with a convoy bound for Okinawa. She arrived off Hagushi beach on 21 May, and operated there through the end of the month.

Alkaid touched at Pearl Harbor in early August. She was undergoing availability when she received word of the Japanese surrender. In September, the ship got underway for Japan. After making calls at Eniwetok, Saipan, and Iwo Jima, Alkaid dropped anchor at Yokosuka, Japan, on 4 October. For the next one and one-half months, the ship served with the occupation forces in Japan.

On 16 November, Alkaid left Japan with a load of homeward-bound American troops and reached Long Beach, California, on 9 December 1945. On 4 January 1946, Alkaid departed Long Beach for San Francisco, California, arriving on 6 January 1946.

== Decommissioning ==
The ship was decommissioned there and returned to the Maritime Commission (MARCOM) on 11 March 1946, and entered the Suisun Bay Reserve Fleet at Suisun Bay, California. Alkaid was stricken from the Navy list on 28 March 1946.

Resuming the name William G. Sumner, the ship remained in reserve into the 1960s. She was sold for scrapping to the National Metal & Steel Corp., on 31 March 1964, for $52,609.15. She was removed from the fleet by the purchaser on 20 April 1964.

== Military awards and honors ==
Alkaid won one battle star for her World War II service.

== Bibliography ==
- "St. John's River Shipbuilding, Jacksonville FL". www.ShipbuildingHistory.com. 16 October 2010.
- Maritime Administration. "William Graham Sumner". Ship History Database Vessel Status Card. U.S. Department of Transportation, Maritime Administration.
- "USS Alkaid (AK-114)". NavSource. 5 December 2014.
- "Alkaid (AK-114)". Dictionary of American Naval Fighting Ships. Naval History and Heritage Command. 11 December 2016. This article incorporates text from this source, which is in the public domain.
- "SS William Graham Sumner".
