= USS Megrez =

Cargo ship of the United States Navy

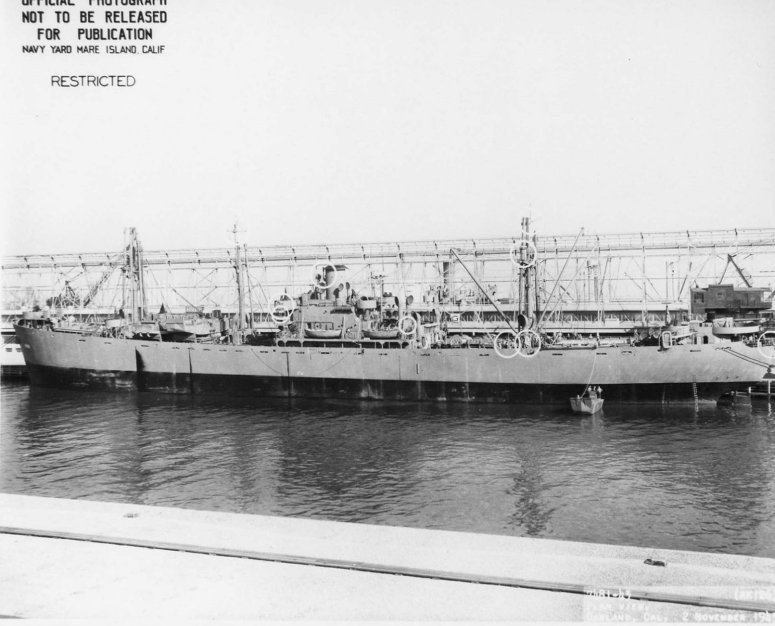
- USS Megrez (AK-126), (plan view - aft) after conversion to US Naval service at Oakland, California, 2 November 1943.

History

United States
- Name: General Vallejo
- Namesake: General Vallejo
- Owner: War Shipping Administration (WSA)
- Operator: Isthmian Steamship Company
- Ordered: as a Type EC2-S-C1 hull, MCE hull 1642
- Builder: California Shipbuilding Corporation, Terminal Island, Los Angeles, California
- Yard number: 175
- Way number: 5
- Laid down: 31 March 1943
- Launched: 23 April 1943
- Sponsored by: Mrs. J. R. Jago
- In service: 6 May 1943
- Fate: transferred to the US Navy, 7 October 1943

United States
- Name: Megrez
- Namesake: The star Megrez
- Acquired: 7 October 1943
- Commissioned: 26 October 1943
- Decommissioned: 29 May 1946
- Renamed: Megrez, 11 October 1943
- Refit: converted for Naval service at Bethlehem Steel Company, Shipbuilding Division, San Francisco, California
- Stricken: 1 August 1947
- Identification: Hull symbol: AK-126; Code letters: NHDX
- Fate: Returned to MARCOM, 18 September 1947, laid up in the National Defense Reserve Fleet, Suisun Bay Group, Benicia, California; Sold for scrapping, 13 June 1974, withdrawn, 21 June 1974

General characteristics
- Class & type: Crater-class cargo ship
- Type: Type EC2-S-C1
- Displacement: 4,023 long tons (4,088 t) (standard); 14,550 long tons (14,780 t) (full load)
- Length: 441 ft 6 in (134.57 m)
- Beam: 56 ft 11 in (17.35 m)
- Draft: 28 ft 4 in (8.64 m)
- Installed power: 2 × Babcock & Wilcox header-type boilers, 220psi 450°; 2,500 shp (1,900 kW)
- Propulsion: 1 × Joshua Hendy vertical triple-expansion reciprocating steam engine; 1 × shaft
- Speed: 12.5 kn (23.2 km/h; 14.4 mph)
- Capacity: 7,800 t (7,700 long tons) DWT; 444,206 cu ft (12,578.5 m^{3}) (non-refrigerated)
- Complement: 18 officers 260 enlisted
- Armament: 1 × 5 in (127 mm)/38 caliber dual-purpose (DP) gun; 1 × 3 in (76 mm)/50 caliber DP gun; 2 × 40 mm (1.57 in) Bofors anti-aircraft (AA) gun mounts; 6 × 20 mm (0.79 in) Oerlikon cannon AA gun mounts

USS Megrez (AK-126) was a Crater-class cargo ship commissioned by the US Navy for service in World War II. Megrez was named after Megrez, a star in the constellation Ursa Major. She was responsible for delivering troops, goods and equipment to locations in the Asiatic-Pacific Theater.

== Construction ==
Megrez was laid down 31 March 1943, under a Maritime Commission (MARCOM) contract, MC hull No. 1642, as the Liberty ship SS General Vallejo, by California Shipbuilding Corporation, Terminal Island, Los Angeles, California; launched on the 23 April 1943; sponsored by Mrs. J. R. Jago. She was acquired by the Navy tinder bareboat charter from MARCOM on the 7 October 1943; renamed Megrez 11 October 1943; converted by the Bethlehem Steel Company, Shipbuilding Division, San Francisco, California; and commissioned 26 October 1943.

== Service history ==
Departing San Francisco Bay on 13 November 1943, Megrez headed for Micronesia. She operated out of Funafuti, and after 6 March 1944, Kwajalein, as the "wholesaler", distributing dry provisions, clothing, medical supplies, and store stock to mobile supply base craft, which in turn distributed supplies to the consumer units of the fleet.

=== Disembarking Material at Saipan and Tinian ===
Megrez returned to Pearl Harbor on 2 June 1944, and took on a cargo of rolling stock, sheet metals, and ammunition for transportation to the Marianas in support of Saipan and Tinian operations. Leaving Hawaiian waters on 19 June 1944, Megrez steamed, via Kwajalein and Eniwetok, for Saipan, arriving on 14 August 1944. Two days later, Megrez moved to Tinian where she discharged the cargo at the rate of 590 short tons (540 t) a day.

=== A floating supply ship ===
Megrez next sailed for Eniwetok, arriving on 31 August, to become a floating supply and freight depot once again. In October she was reassigned and on her arrival at Ulithi on 14 October, she became a station ship for the issuance of lube oil to the US 3rd Fleet and the US 5th Fleet. Megrez served in this capacity for the next 7 months, supplying this vital fluid to the warships as they pressed closer to the enemy's home islands.

=== Supporting Philippine operations ===
On 13 April 1945, her tour as a floating supply center completed, Megrez departed Ulithi for Kossol Roads carrying fleet freight and general stores and supplies. She arrived in the Palau Islands on 14 April, unloaded her cargo and departed for San Pedro Bay, Philippine Islands, on 18 April.

=== End-of-war activity ===
Through September, Megrez freighted cargo among the Philippines and between San Pedro Bay and Ulithi. On 5 October 1945, she departed for Buckner Bay, Okinawa, arriving on 13 October, and then continued on to Japan on 3 November. Arriving at Yokosuka on 7 November, she then supplied ships in the Sea of Japan, the Yellow Sea and the East China Sea before departing for Pearl Harbor in December 1946 .

== Post-war decommissioning ==
Megrez was decommissioned at Pearl Harbor on 29 May 1946, and was towed to San Francisco, California a year later. Her name was struck from the Navy Register on 1 August 1947, and she was turned over to MARCOM on 18 September 1947.

== Fate ==
She was placed in the National Defense Reserve Fleet, Suisun Bay Group, until purchased by Zidell Exploration, Inc., on 13 June 1974, for $175,679.97, under a "nontransportation use" (NTU) contract. She was physically removed from the Reserve Fleet on 8 August 1964.

== Awards ==
Navy records do not record any battle stars awarded to this ship. However, Megrez's crew was eligible for the following medals:

- American Campaign Medal
- Asiatic-Pacific Campaign Medal
- World War II Victory Medal
- Navy Occupation Service Medal (with Asia clasp)
- Philippines Liberation Medal

== Notes ==
Citations

== Bibliography ==
Online resources

- "Megrez". Dictionary of American Naval Fighting Ships. Naval History and Heritage Command. 7 August 2015. This article incorporates text from this source, which is in the public domain.
- "California Shipbuilding, Los Angeles CA". www.ShipbuildingHistory.com. 13 October 2010.
- "USS Megrez (AK-126)". NavSource. 8 November 2013.
- "General Vallejo". United States Department of Transportation. Archived from the original on December 12, 2019.
- "Megrez". United States Department of Transportation. Archived from the original on December 12, 2019.
