= Johann Georg Liebknecht =

German theologian and scientist

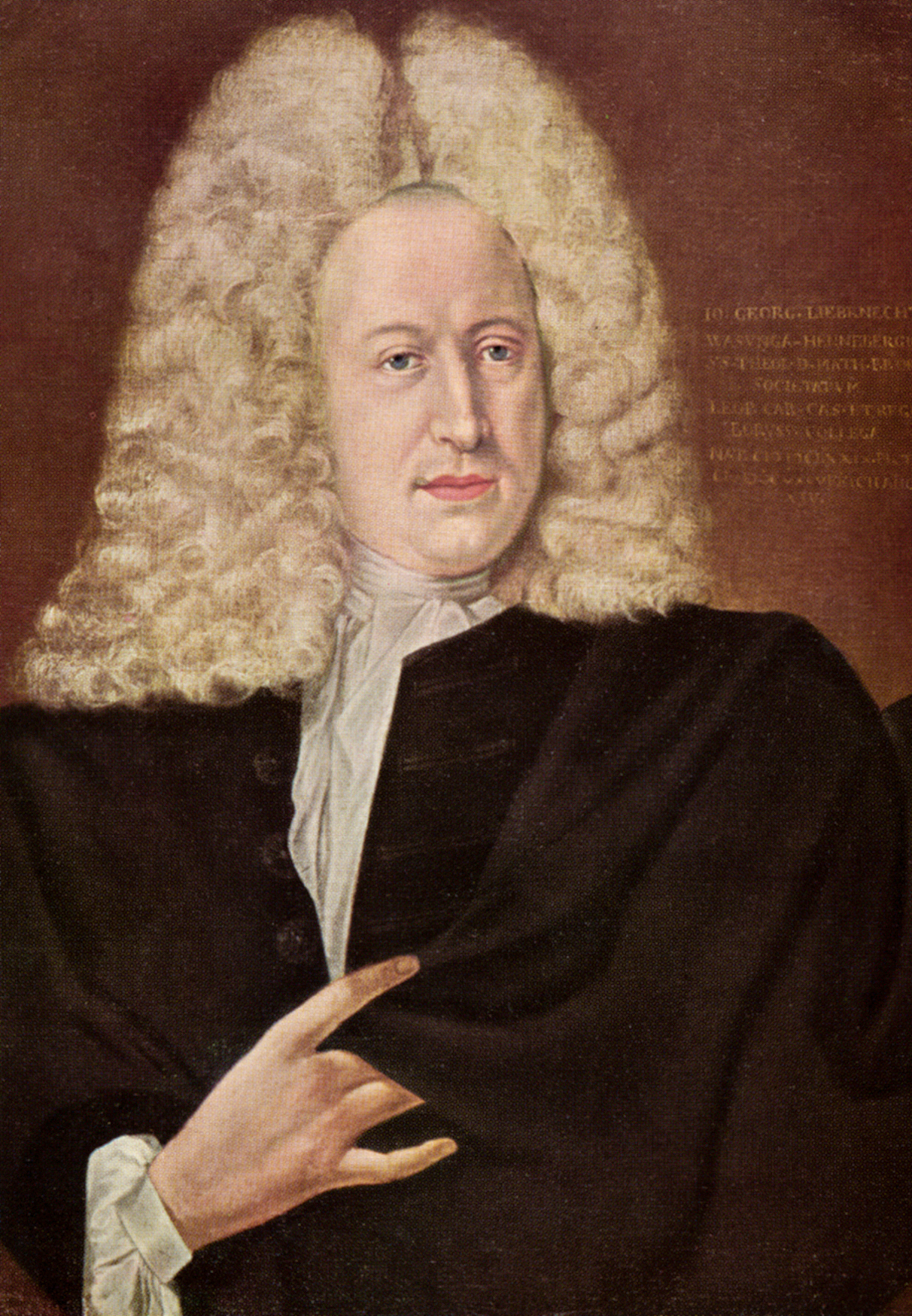
Johann Georg Liebknecht

Johann Georg Liebknecht (23 April 1679 in Wasungen, Thuringia – 17 September 1749 in Giessen) was a German theologian and scientist. He was professor of mathematics and theology at the Ludoviciana (University) in Giessen, Germany.

== Biography ==
He was born the son of Michael Liebknecht, schoolmaster, of Wasungen, and his wife, Margarethe Turckin and was educated in the Gymnasium at Schleusingen and at Jena. He was awarded MA (1702), BD (1717) and DD (1719)

Liebknecht was offered a position, on the recommendation of Gottfried Wilhelm Leibniz, at the small state university in Giessen; he was versatile and could teach several subjects competently. He was both a respected Evangelical theologian and a leading mathematician. Other focal points of his work lay in the application of mathematics in the military (artillery, fortresses), geology (mineral deposits), archeology (excavations of grave mounds near Giessen), fossils and astronomy. Like other Protestant theologians he avoided, even 200 years after Copernicus, supporting the heliocentric world view. He was in contact with famous scientists such as Leibniz. From 1707 to 1737 he was Professor of Mathematics at Giessen and from 1721 until his death also Professor of Theology.

From 1715 he was a member of the Leopoldina (Deutsche Akademie der Naturforscher Leopoldina) and from 1716 a member of the Royal Prussian Society of Sciences. In 1728 he was elected a Fellow of the Royal Society.

== Sidus Ludoviciana ==
Liebknecht was a keen astronomer. He made some of the rare aurora observations during the period 1711–1721. For another observation, however, he gained no credit. On 2 December 1722, he observed a faint star in the telescope and thought he observed relative motion (proper motion) to the neighbouring stars of the Big Dipper, Mizar and Alcor. He called the supposed new planet Sidus Ludoviciana. Liebknecht was unaware, however, that this star had already been observed in the same position in 1616 by Benedetto Castelli and could not therefore be a planet.

== Family ==
He married twice; firstly Catharine Elisabeth, daughter of Nikolaus Caspar Elwerten, physician, of Bensheim and secondly Regina Sophie, daughter of Johann Just Hoffmann, physician, of Isenburg. He had 21 children from his two marriages.
