= USS Alcor =

USS Alcor may refer to the following ships of the United States Navy:

- USS Alcor (AD-34), a destroyer tender
- USS Alcor (AK-259) a Victory ship laid down in 1944
