= Alkaid =

Star in the constellation Ursa Major

- Location of Alkaid (circled)

Observation data Epoch J2000 Equinox ICRS
- Constellation: Ursa Major
- Right ascension: 13^{h} 47^{m} 32.43776^{s}
- Declination: +49° 18′ 47.7602″
- Apparent magnitude (V): +1.86

Characteristics
- Evolutionary stage: main sequence
- Spectral type: B3 V
- U−B color index: −0.68
- B−V color index: −0.19

Astrometry
Radial velocity (R_{v})	−10.9 km/s
Proper motion (μ)	RA: −121.17 mas/yr Dec.: −14.91 mas/yr
Parallax (π)	31.38±0.24 mas
Distance	103.9 ± 0.8 ly (31.9 ± 0.2 pc)
Absolute magnitude (M_{V})	−0.67

Details
Mass	5.071±0.023 M_{☉}
Radius	2.894 (equatorial); 2.665 (polar) R_{☉}
Luminosity	574 L_{☉}
Surface gravity (log g)	3.78 cgs
Temperature	16,329 (equatorial); 17,720 (polar) K
Rotation	14.6 (equatorial) days 15.6 (polar) days
Rotational velocity (v sin i)	154.3±9.1 km/s
Age	6+2 −4 Myr

Other designations
- Alkaid, Benetnash, Benetnasch, Elkeid, η UMa, 85 UMa, BD+50°2027, FK5 509, GC 18643, HD 120315, HIP 67301, HR 5191, PPM 53742, SAO 44752.

Database references
SIMBAD	data

Alkaid /ælˈkeɪd/, also called Eta Ursae Majoris (Latinised from η Ursae Majoris, abbreviated Eta UMa, η UMa), is a star in the constellation of Ursa Major. It is the easternmost star in the Big Dipper (or Plough) asterism. However, unlike most stars of the Big Dipper, it is not a member of the Ursa Major moving group. With an apparent visual magnitude of +1.86, it is the third-brightest star in the constellation and one of the brightest stars in the night sky.

== Physical properties ==
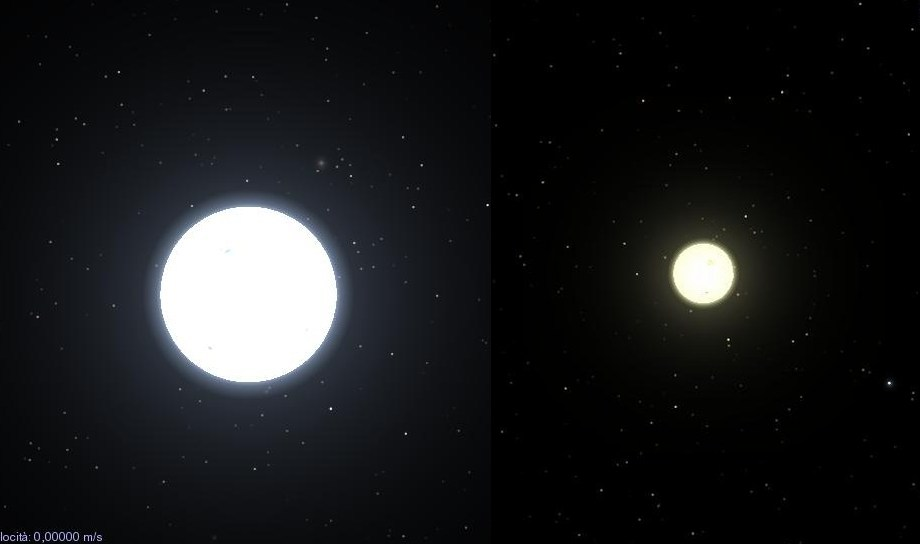
Comparison of Alkaid (left) and the Sun (right)

Alkaid is a B-type main sequence star with a stellar classification of B3 V. Since 1943, the spectrum of this star has served as one of the stable anchor points by which other stars are classified.

Alkaid has 5.07 times the mass of the Sun. It is a young star, roughly six million years old, and is in the beginning of its life in the main sequence (ZAMS). The star rotates rapidly, with a projected rotational velocity of 154.3±9.1 km/s. Correcting for its inclination angle of 42° implies an equatorial rotational velocity of 240 km/s. As a consequence of its rapid rotation, Alkaid is oblate, with a radius of 2.89 solar radii (R_{☉}) at the equator, and 2.66 solar radii at the poles. The effective temperature also varies across latitudes, being of 16,300 K at the equator and 17,700 K at the poles. Such a temperature gives it the blue-white hue of a B-type star. This star is an X-ray emitter with a luminosity of 9.3 × 10^{28} erg s^{−1}.

Eta Ursae Majoris was listed as a standard star for the spectral type B3 V. It has broadened absorption lines due to its rapid rotation, which is common in stars of this type. However, the lines are very slightly distorted and variable, which may be caused by some emission from a weak disk of material produced by the rapid rotation.

Alkaid is a relatively nearby and bright star and has been examined closely, but no exoplanets or companion stars have been discovered.

== Nomenclature ==
η Ursae Majoris (Latinised to Eta Ursae Majoris) is the star's Bayer designation. The International Astronomical Union has formally chosen the proper name Alkaid for this star.

It bore the traditional names Alkaid (or Elkeid from the Arabic القايد القائد) and Benetnasch /ˈbɛnɛtnæʃ/. Alkaid derives from the Arabic phrase meaning "The leader of the daughters of the bier" (قائد بنات نعش qā'id bināt naʿsh). The daughters of the bier, i.e. the mourning maidens, are the three stars of the handle of the Big Dipper, Alkaid, Mizar, and Alioth; while the four stars of the bowl, Megrez, Phecda, Merak, and Dubhe, are the bier.

It is known as Běidǒuqī (北斗七 - the Seventh Star of the Northern Dipper) or Yáoguāng (瑤光 - the Star of Twinkling Brilliance) in Chinese.

The Hindus viewed this star as Marīci (Sanskrit: मरीचि), one of the seven Saptarshis (Sanskrit: सप्तर्षि).

In Japan and Korea, Alkaid is known as Hagunsei and Mukokseong respectively ("the military breaking star" or "most corner star"). Both meanings come from ancient China's influence in both countries.

== In culture ==
USS Alkaid (AK-114) was a United States Navy Crater class cargo ship named after the star.

Alkaid is one of the Behenian fixed stars, used in Alchemy.

The fossil starfish Alkaidia is named after Alkaid.
