= Mizar =

Quadruple star system in Ursa Major

- Location of Mizar (circled)

Observation data Epoch J2000 Equinox ICRS
- Constellation: Ursa Major
- Mizar
- Right ascension: 13^{h} 23^{m} 55.54048^{s}
- Declination: +54° 55′ 31.2671″
- Apparent magnitude (V): 2.04
- ζ^{1} UMa
- Right ascension: 13^{h} 23^{m} 55.543^{s}
- Declination: +54° 55′ 31.30″
- Apparent magnitude (V): 2.23
- ζ^{2} UMa
- Right ascension: 13^{h} 23^{m} 56.330^{s}
- Declination: +54° 55′ 18.56″
- Apparent magnitude (V): 3.88

Characteristics

ζ^{1} UMa
- Spectral type: A2Vp/A2Vp
- U−B color index: −0.01
- B−V color index: +0.02

ζ^{2} UMa
- Spectral type: kA1h(eA)mA7IV-V
- U−B color index: +0.09
- B−V color index: +0.13

Astrometry
Radial velocity (R_{v})	−6.31 km/s
Proper motion (μ)	RA: 119.01 mas/yr Dec.: −25.97 mas/yr
Parallax (π)	39.36±0.30 mas
Distance	82.9 ± 0.6 ly (25.4 ± 0.2 pc)
Absolute magnitude (M_{V})	+0.32/+1.96

Orbit
Primary	Mizar Aa
Secondary	Mizar Ab
Period (P)	20.5386 days
Semi-major axis (a)	9.83±0.03 mas
Eccentricity (e)	0.5415±0.0016
Inclination (i)	60.5±0.3°
Longitude of the node (Ω)	106.0±0.4°
Periastron epoch (T)	RJD 54536.9904
Argument of periastron (ω) (secondary)	105.27±0.23°
Semi-amplitude (K_{1}) (primary)	66.478±0.153 km/s
Semi-amplitude (K_{2}) (secondary)	66.019±0.177 km/s

Orbit
Primary	Mizar Ba
Secondary	Mizar Bb
Period (P)	175.06±0.04 d
Eccentricity (e)	0.56±0.02
Periastron epoch (T)	58,175.9±0.4
Argument of periastron (ω) (secondary)	353.1±4.1°
Semi-amplitude (K_{1}) (primary)	6.42±0.15 km/s

Details

Aa
Mass	2.2224±0.0221 M_{☉}
Radius	2.4±0.1 R_{☉}
Luminosity	33.3±2.1 L_{☉}
Temperature	9,000±200 K
Age	370 Myr

Ab
Mass	2.2381±0.0219 M_{☉}
Radius	2.4±0.1 R_{☉}
Luminosity	33.3±2.1 L_{☉}
Temperature	9,000±200 K

Ba
Mass	1.85 M_{☉}
Radius	1.8 (Note: Calculated, using the Stefan-Boltzmann law and the star's effective temperature and luminosity, with respect to the solar nominal effective temperature of 5,772 K: $$\sqrt{\biggl(\frac{5{,}772}{8{,}280}\biggr)^4 \cdot 10^{1.1367}} = 1.8\ R_\odot$$) R_{☉}
Luminosity	13.7 L_{☉}
Surface gravity (log g)	4.40 cgs
Temperature	8,280 K
Rotational velocity (v sin i)	61 km/s

Bb
Mass	0.25 M_{☉}

Other designations
- ζ Ursae Majoris, ζ UMa, Zeta UMa, 79 Ursae Majoris, BD+55 1598, CCDM J13240+5456, HIP 65378, WDS J13239+5456
- ζ^{1} UMa: ζ UMa A, GC 18133, HD 116656, HR 5054, PPM 34007, SAO 28737
- ζ^{2} UMa: ζ UMa B, GC 18134, HD 116657, HR 5055, SAO 28738

Database references
SIMBAD	Mizar
- ζ^{1} UMa
- ζ^{2} UMa

Mizar /ˈmaɪzɑːr/ is a second-magnitude star in the handle of the Big Dipper asterism in the constellation of Ursa Major. It has the Bayer designation ζ Ursae Majoris (Latinised as Zeta Ursae Majoris). It forms a well-known naked eye double star with the fainter star Alcor (a binary system consisting of Alcor A and Alcor B), and is itself a quadruple star system. The Mizar and Alcor system lies about 83 light-years away from the Sun, as measured by the Hipparcos astrometry satellite, and is part of the Ursa Major Moving Group.

== Nomenclature ==
ζ Ursae Majoris (Latinised to Zeta Ursae Majoris and abbreviated to ζ UMa or Zeta UMa) is Mizar's Bayer designation. It also has the Flamsteed designation 79 Ursae Majoris.

The traditional name Mizar derives from the Arabic المئزر miʼzar meaning 'apron; wrapper, covering, cover'. In 2016, the International Astronomical Union organized a Working Group on Star Names (WGSN) to catalog and standardize proper names for stars. The WGSN's first bulletin in July 2016 included a table of the first two groups of names approved by the WGSN that included Mizar for ζ UMa. According to IAU rules, the name Mizar strictly only applies to component Aa, although it is traditionally and popularly used for all four stars making up the double naked-eye star. Mizar and Alcor, termed the "horse and rider" by the Arabians, are a good test of minimal vision.

== Stellar system ==
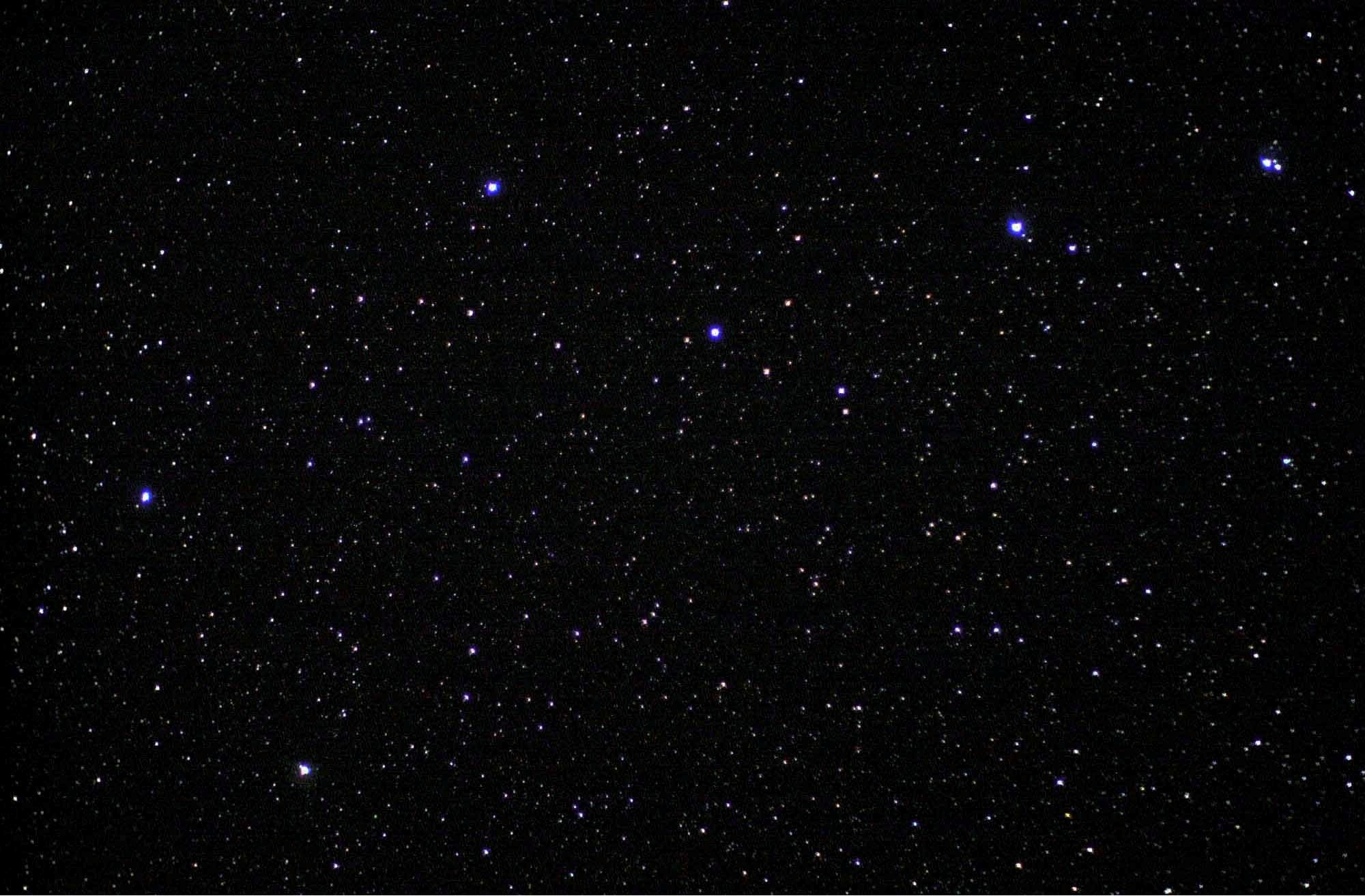
The Big Dipper's bowl and part of the handle photographed from the International Space Station. Mizar and Alcor are at the upper right.

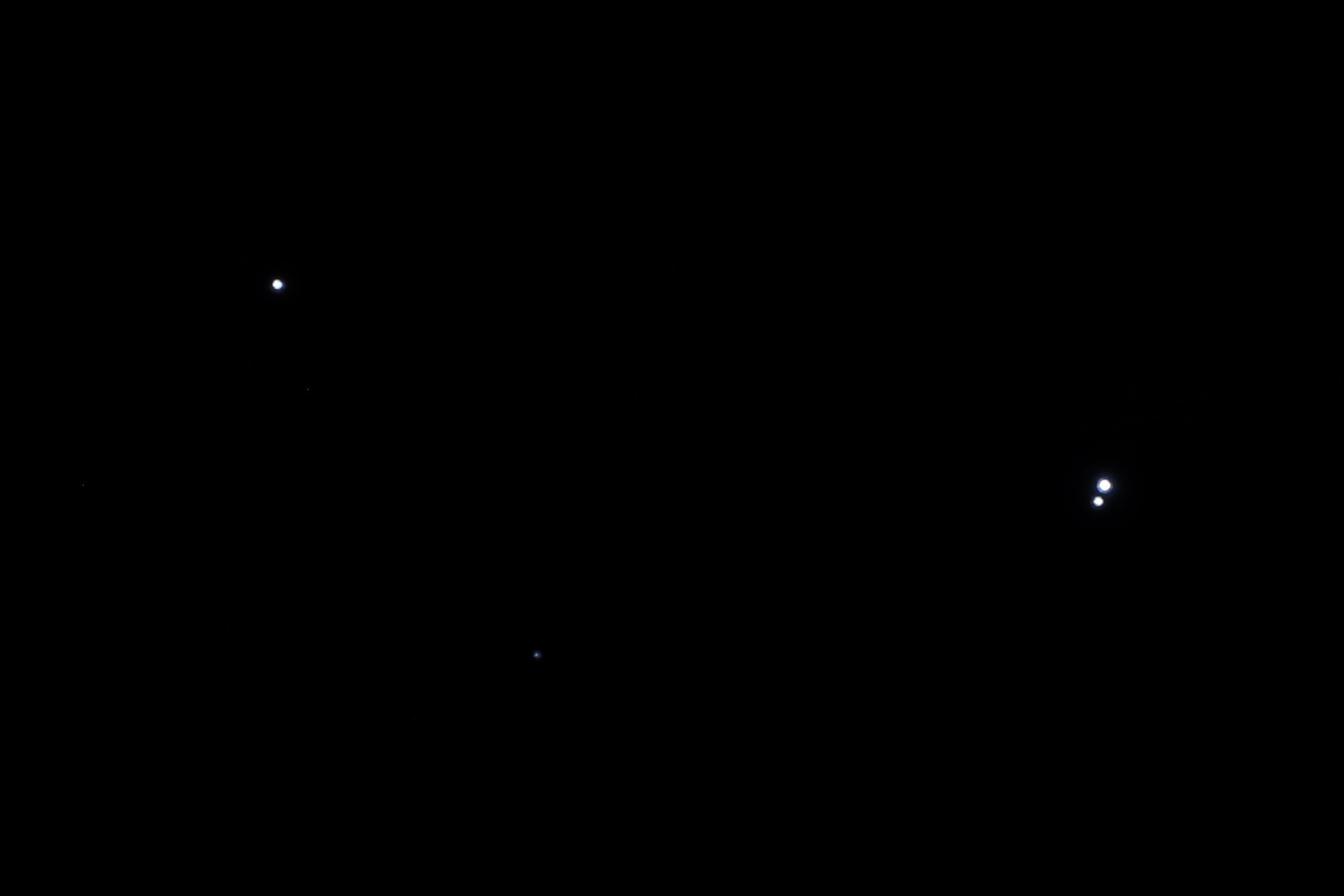
The multiple star system of Mizar (the double star on the right) and Alcor (left). The unrelated, fainter star Sidus Ludoviciana can be seen lower down.

Mizar is a visual double with a separation of 14.4 arcseconds, each of which is a spectroscopic binary. Its combined apparent magnitude is 2.04. The two visible stars are referred to as ζ^{1} and ζ^{2} Ursae Majoris, or Mizar A and B. The spectroscopic components are generally referred to as Mizar Aa, Ab, Ba, and Bb. The stars all share a single Hipparcos designation of HIP 65378, but separate Bright Star Catalogue and Henry Draper Catalogue entries. Mizar, together with Alcor and many of the other bright stars in Ursa Major, is a member of the Ursa Major Moving Group.

Mizar may have been the first telescopic binary known to Europeans; Benedetto Castelli in 1617 asked Galileo Galilei to observe it. Galileo then produced a detailed record of the double star. Later, around 1650, Riccioli wrote of Mizar appearing as a double. The secondary star (Mizar B) comes within 380 AU of the primary (Mizar A) and the two take thousands of years to revolve around each other.

Mizar A was the first spectroscopic binary to be discovered, as part of Antonia Maury's spectral classification work, and an orbit was published in 1890. Some spectroscopic binaries cannot be visually resolved and are discovered by studying the spectral lines of the suspect system over a long period of time. The two components of Mizar A are both about 35 times as bright as the Sun, and revolve around each other in about 20 days 12 hours and 55 minutes. In 1908, Mizar B was also found to be a spectroscopic binary, its components completing an orbital period every six months. In 1996, 107 years after their discovery, the components of the Mizar A binary system were imaged in extremely high resolution using the Navy Prototype Optical Interferometer.

=== ζ^{1} Ursae Majoris ===
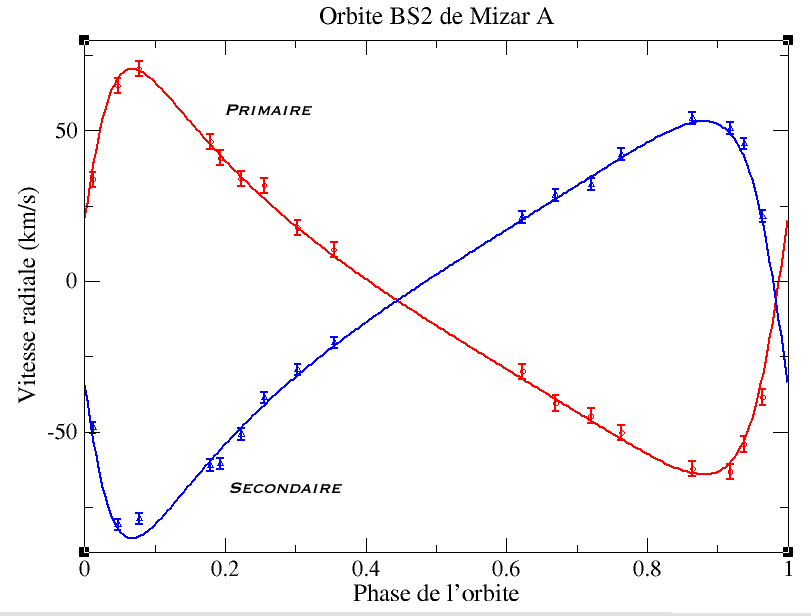
Radial velocity curves for the two almost identical components

The two components of ζ^{1} Ursae Majoris (Mizar Aa and Ab) are observed to be identical, with the exception of slightly different radial velocity variations which indicate very slightly different masses.

The spectral lines of the two stars can be observed separately and both are given a spectral type of A2Vp. They are Ap stars, chemically peculiar due to stratification of some heavy elements in the photosphere of slowly-rotating hot stars. In this case, they show elevated abundances of strontium and silicon.

With the assumption of identical physical properties for the two stars, they both have temperatures of 9,000 K, radii of 2.4 R_{☉}, and bolometric luminosities of 33.3 L_{☉}. They are thought to be around 370 million years old.

=== ζ^{2} Ursae Majoris ===
ζ^{2} Ursae Majoris is a single-lined spectroscopic binary, and the visible spectrum is of an Am star, named for their unusually strong lines of some metals. The spectral type of kA1h(eA)mA7IV-V is in a form used for metallic-lined stars: the type is A1 based on the calcium K lines, early A based on the hydrogen lines, and A7 based on lines of other metals. The luminosity class is ranked between main sequence and subgiant. An analysis of the star's properties instead suggest it is in the main sequence. The main star is 1.85 times the mass of the Sun.

The secondary component is a small star of undefined spectral type, with 25% of the Sun's mass.

== Other names ==
Mizar is known as Vashistha, one of the Saptarishi, in traditional Indian astronomy. Chinese Taoism personifies ζ Ursae Majoris as the Lu star.

In Chinese, 北斗 (Běi Dǒu), meaning Northern Dipper, refers to an asterism equivalent to the Big Dipper. Consequently, the Chinese name for ζ Ursae Majoris itself is 北斗六 Běi Dǒu liù, (English: the Sixth Star of Northern Dipper) and 開陽 Kāi Yáng, (English: Star of The Opener of Heat).

In the Mi'kmaq myth of the great bear and the seven hunters, Mizar is Chickadee and Alcor is his cooking pot.

=== Military namesakes ===
- USS Mizar is a cargo and passenger liner converted to a United States Navy ship
- USNS Mizar, a United States Navy ship

== In popular culture ==
The band Steely Dan references Mizar in their song "Sign In Stranger" from their album The Royal Scam.

Mizar is the home system of a race of friendly, spherical aliens contacted by the Earth ship Stardust in the 1971 science fiction short story "The Bear With the Knot on His Tail" by Stephen Tall.
