= USS Alcor (AD-34) =

Tender of the United States Navy

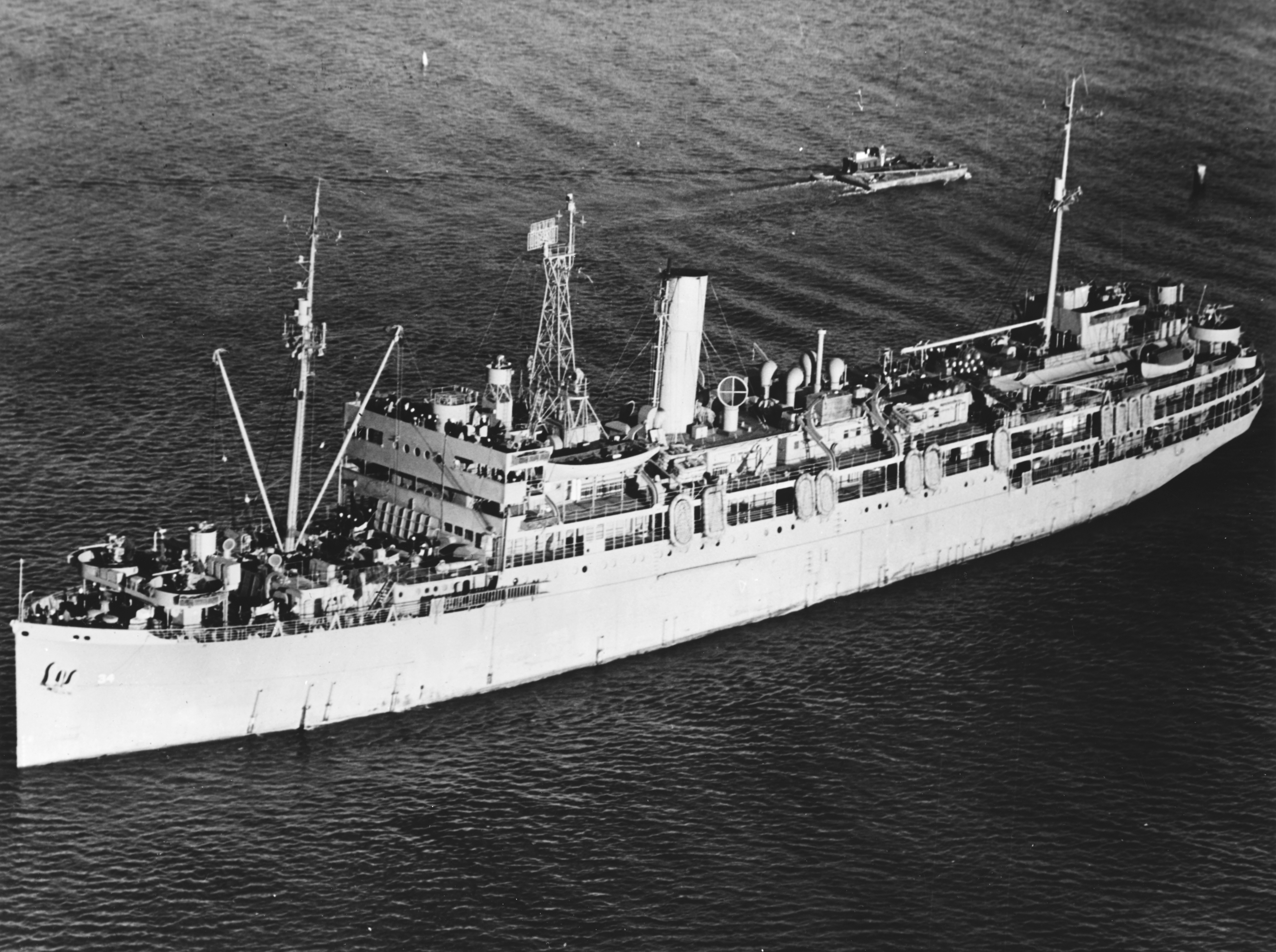

History

United States
- Name: USS Alcor
- Builder: Federal Shipbuilding and Dry Dock Company, Kearny, New Jersey
- Laid down: 1926, as SS Dixie
- Launched: 31 January 1927
- Acquired: 3 March 1941
- Commissioned: 4 September 1941
- Decommissioned: 5 August 1946
- Reclassified: AG-34, (Miscellaneous Auxiliary), 4 September 1941; AR-10 (Repair Ship), 22 December 1941; AD-34 (Destroyer Tender), 6 November 1944
- Stricken: 28 August 1946
- Fate: Sold, 6 August 1946; Scrapped, 1950

General characteristics
- Type: Destroyer tender
- Displacement: 12,250 long tons (12,447 t)
- Length: 445 ft (136 m)
- Beam: 60 ft (18 m)
- Draft: 25 ft 8 in (7.82 m)
- Speed: 16.5 knots (30.6 km/h; 19.0 mph)
- Complement: 734 officers and enlisted
- Armament: 4 × single 3"/50 caliber guns; 2 × single 40 mm AA gun mounts; 8 × single 20 mm AA gun mounts

USS Alcor (AD-34) was a destroyer tender, the lone ship in her class, named for a star (also known as the 80 Ursae Majoris) in the constellation Ursa Major.

Originally built in 1928 as SS Dixie at the Federal Shipbuilding and Dry Dock Company in Kearny, New Jersey, she was formally acquired by the United States Navy on 3 March 1941 from the Southern Pacific Steamship lines (Morgan Line) and converted for naval service at the Bethlehem Steel Key Highway Plant in Baltimore, Maryland. The vessel was commissioned as USS Alcor (AG-34) on 4 September 1941.

== Service history ==
The ship got underway on 7 December to sail to Casco Bay, Maine. After completing shakedown training, she shaped a course for Norfolk, Virginia and, upon reaching that port on 19 December, became the flagship of Commander, Train, Atlantic Fleet. Re-classified a repair ship and redesignated AR-10 on 22 December 1941 Alcor began a tour of duty at Norfolk (repairing damage and making alterations to warships) that lasted for more than 30 months.

Her protracted sojourn at Norfolk came to an end on 4 July 1944 when the repair ship got underway for the New England coast. She reached Casco Bay on 14 July and became the flagship of Commander, Destroyers, Atlantic Fleet. She remained in Casco Bay for the next five months making repairs for various ships of the fleet. While carrying out this assignment, her designation was changed to AD-34 on 6 November 1944. In early January, 1945 the destroyer tender left the east coast, bound for the Pacific. She transited the Panama Canal and joined the Pacific Fleet on 16 January. Alcor continued on to Hawaii and arrived at Pearl Harbor on 3 February. She provided tender services there until 4 June, when she sailed for the Philippine Islands. While en route, the vessel was diverted to Eniwetok. After a four-day layover for a special construction project, the tender resumed her original course and arrived at Leyte on 26 June. There, she reported to Service Squadron 10 for duty and began repair work for various ships. During Alcor's service in the Philippines, Japan capitulated on 15 August 1945.

Alcor left Philippine waters on 14 September and headed for Okinawa. She reached Buckner Bay on the 18th and resumed her tender duties. She sailed for Japan on 28 February 1946. Her first stop was at Sasebo, where she carried out repair work through late March. Alcor then moved her operations to Yokosuka. The tender finished her tour there on 8 May, then shaped a course for the United States. After a pause en route at Pearl Harbor, the ship reached San Diego on 3 June. She sailed back through the Panama Canal and reached Norfolk on 22 June. Preparations were begun for her deactivation, and Alcor was decommissioned on 5 August 1946. The vessel was sold on 6 August 1946. Her name was struck from the Naval Vessel Register on 28 August 1946; she was later scrapped in 1950.
