= Big Dipper =

Pattern of seven bright stars in the constellation Ursa Major

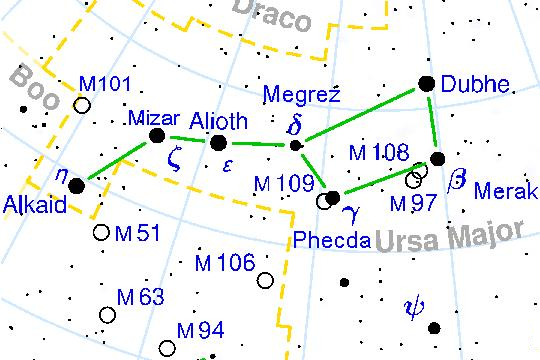
The asterism of the Big Dipper (shown in this star map in green) lies within the constellation of Ursa Major.

The Big Dipper (Canada, US) or the Plough (UK, Ireland) is an asterism consisting of seven bright stars of the constellation Ursa Major; six of them are of second magnitude and one, Megrez (δ), of third magnitude. Four define a "bowl" or "body" and three define a "handle" or "head". It is recognized as a distinct grouping in many cultures. The North Star (Polaris), the current northern pole star and the tip of the handle of the Little Dipper (Little Bear), can be located by extending an imaginary line through the front two stars of the asterism, Merak (β) and Dubhe (α), sometimes known as "the Pointers". This makes it useful in celestial navigation.

== Names and places ==
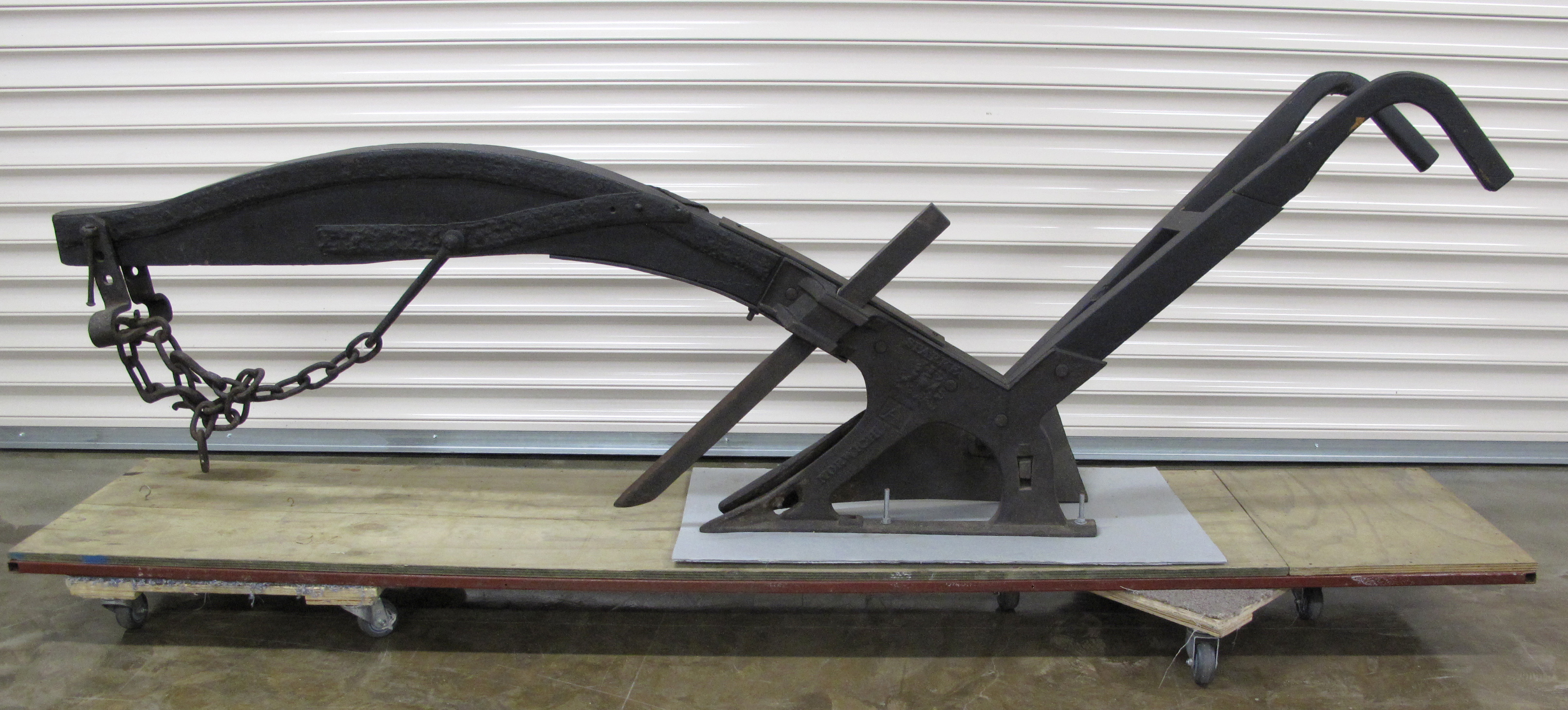
An 1820s plough

The constellation of Ursa Major (Latin: Greater Bear) has been seen as a bear, a plough, a wagon, or a ladle. The "bear" tradition is Indo-European (appearing in Greek, as well as in Vedic India), but apparently the name "bear" has parallels in Siberian or North American traditions.

=== European astronomy ===
The Big Dipper seen from Fujian

The name "Bear" is Homeric, and apparently native to Greece, while the "Wain" tradition is Mesopotamian. Book XVIII of Homer's Iliad mentions it as "the Bear, which men also call the Wain". In Latin, these seven stars were known as the "Seven Oxen" (septentriones, from septem triōnēs). Classical Greek mythography identified the "Bear" as the nymph Callisto, changed into a she-bear by Hera, the jealous wife of Zeus.

In Ireland and the United Kingdom, this pattern is known as the Plough (Irish: An Camchéachta – the bent plough). The symbol of the Starry Plough has been used as a political symbol by Irish Republican and Irish left wing movements. Former names include the Great Wain (i.e., wagon), Arthur's Wain or Butcher's Cleaver. The terms Charles's Wain and Charles his Wain are derived from the still older Carlswæn. A folk etymology holds that this derived from Charlemagne, but the name is common to all the Germanic languages and the original reference was to the churls' (i.e., the men's) wagon, in contrast to the women's wagon, (the Little Dipper). An older "Odin's Wain" may have preceded these Nordic designations.

In German, it is known as the "Great Wagon" (Großer Wagen) and, less often, the "Great Bear" (Großer Bär). Likewise, in the North Germanic languages, it is known by variations of "Charles's Wagon" (Karlavagnen, Karlsvogna, or Karlsvognen) which simply means the men's wagon where the constellation The Little Bear (Ursa Minor) is the women's wagon, but also the "Great Bear" (Stora Björn), and to the Norse pagans, it was known as Óðins vagn; "Woden's wagon". In Dutch, its official name is the "Great Bear" (Grote Beer), but it is popularly known as the "Saucepan" (Steelpan). In Italian, it is called either the "Great Wagon" (Grande Carro) or "Orsa Maggiore" ("Greater Bear"). Romanian and most Slavic languages also call it the "Great Wagon". The famous double star Mizar/Alcor is also called the Horse and Rider which would make sense when the stars representing horses in a span.

In Hungarian, it is commonly known as "Göncöl's Wagon" (Göncölszekér) or, less often, "Big Göncöl" (Nagy Göncöl) after a táltos (shaman) in Hungarian mythology who carried medicine that could cure any disease. In Finnish, the figure is known as Otava with established etymology in the archaic meaning 'salmon net', although other uses of the word refer to 'bear' and 'wheel'. The bear relation is claimed to stem from the animal's resemblance to—and mythical origin from—the asterism rather than vice versa.

In Lithuanian, the stars of Ursa Major are known as Didieji Grįžulo Ratai ("The Big Back Wheels"). Other names for the constellation include Perkūno Ratai ("The Wheels of Perkūnas"), Kaušas ("The Bucket"), Vežimas ("The Carriage"), and Samtis ("The Ladle"). In Latvian, it is known as Lielie Greizie Rati ("The Great Crooked Wagon") or Lielais Kauss ("The Great Cup").

In the Sámi languages of Northern Europe, the constellation is identified as the bow of the great hunter Fávdna (the star Arcturus). In the main Sámi language, North Sámi it is called Fávdnadávgi ("Fávdna's bow") or simply dávggát ("the bow"). The constellation features prominently in the Sámi anthem, which begins with the words Guhkkin davvin dávggáid vuolde sabmá suolggai Sámieanan, which translates to "Far to the north, under the Bow, the Land of the Sámi slowly comes into view." The Bow is an important part of the Sámi traditional narrative about the night sky, in which various hunters try to chase down Sarva, the Great Reindeer, a large constellation that takes up almost half the sky. According to the legend, Fávdna stands ready to fire his Bow every night but hesitates because he might hit Stella Polaris, known as Boahji ("the Rivet"), which would cause the sky to collapse and end the world.

=== Arab astronomy ===
The Arabic names بَنَاتُ نَعْشٍ الكُبْرَى (Banāt Naʿsh al-Kubrā), بَنُو نَعْشٍ (Banū Naʿsh), and آلُ نَعْشٍ (Āl Naʿsh) refer to the constellation known in Western astronomy as the Big Dipper, which is part of Ursa Major. The term “Banāt Naʿsh” translates to “the daughters of the bier (funeral litter),” reflecting an ancient Arab mythological interpretation of the star pattern. In this context, the four bright stars forming the “bowl” of the Big Dipper represent a funeral bier, while the three stars forming the “handle” symbolize mourners or daughters following behind in a funeral procession. This naming convention is deeply rooted in Arabic oral traditions and ancient Bedouin star lore, where celestial objects were often associated with narratives that mirrored life, death, and human experiences. Such names highlight the rich etymological and mythological traditions of pre-Islamic and early Islamic culture, where stars were used for navigation, storytelling, and timekeeping.

=== Asian traditions ===
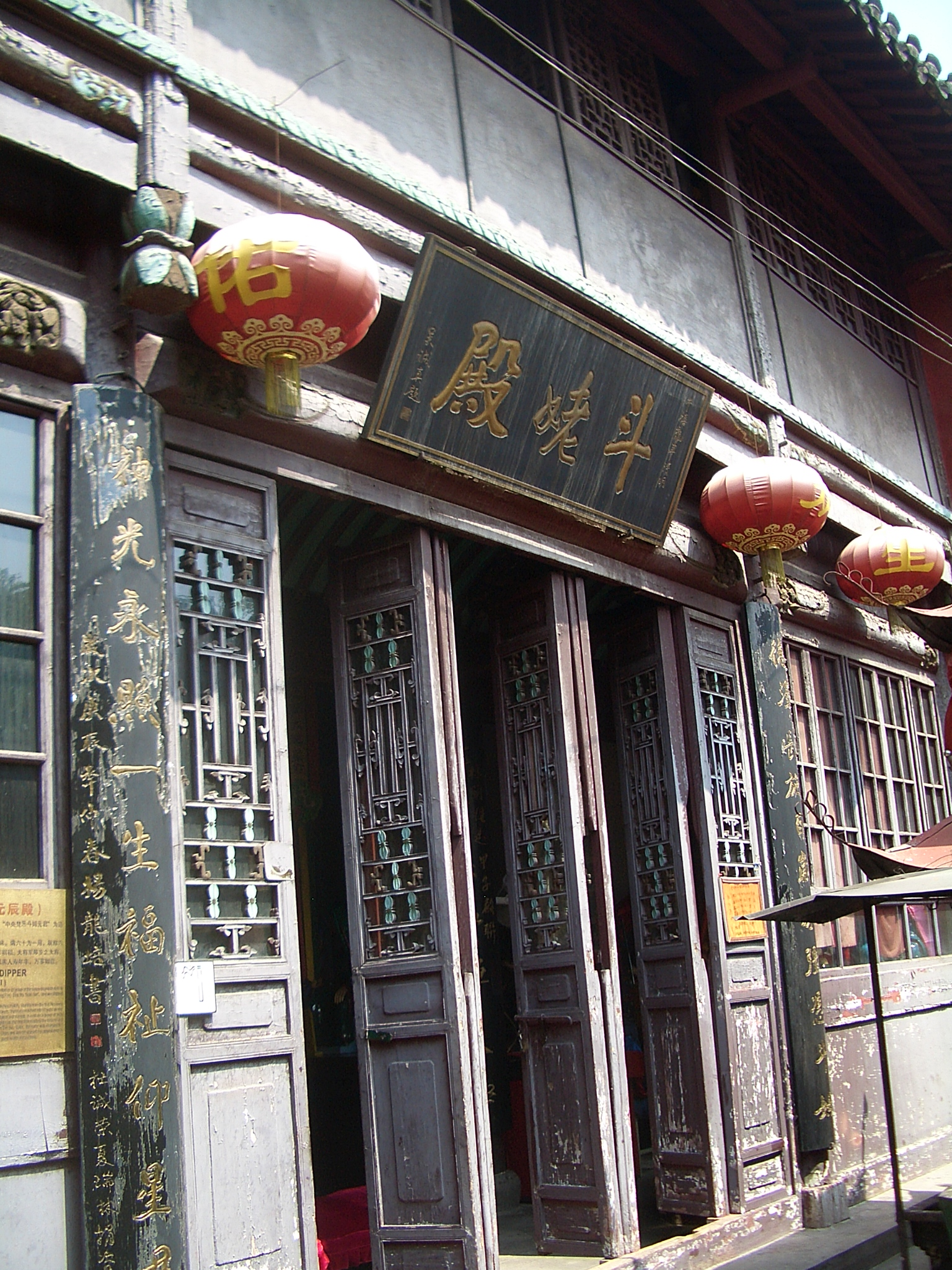
The Hall of the Big Dipper in a Taoist temple, Wuhan

In Chinese astronomy and Chinese constellation records, The Big Dipper is called "Beidou" (Chinese: 北斗; pinyin: Běi Dǒu), which literally means Northern Dipper. It refers to an asterism equivalent to the Big Dipper. The Chinese name for Alpha Ursae Majoris is Beidou Yi (Chinese: 北斗一; pinyin: Běi Dǒu yī; lit. 'Beidou One') and Tianshu (Chinese: 天樞; pinyin: Tiān Shū; lit. 'Star of Celestial Pivot'). The asterism name was mentioned in Warring States period (c. 475–221 BCE) stellar records, in which the asterism is described to have seven stars in the shape of a dipper or a chariot.

The Chinese astronomy records were translated to other East Asian cultures in the Sinosphere. The most prominent name is the "Northern Dipper" (北斗) and the "Seven Stars of the Northern Dipper" (Chinese and Japanese: 北斗七星; pinyin: Běidǒu Qīxīng; Cantonese Yale: Bak¹-dau² Cat¹-sing¹; rōmaji: Hokuto Shichisei; Korean: 북두칠성; romaja: Bukdu Chilseong; Vietnamese: Bắc Đẩu thất tinh). In astrology, these stars are generally considered to compose the Right Wall of the Purple Forbidden Enclosure which surrounds the Northern Celestial Pole, although numerous other groupings and names have been made over the centuries. Similarly, each star has a distinct name, which likewise has varied over time and depending upon the asterism being constructed. (Note: See their individual pages.) The personification of the Big Dipper itself is also known as "Doumu" (斗母) in Chinese folk religion and Taoism, and Marici in Buddhism.

In Vietnam, the colloquial name for the asterism is Sao Bánh lái lớn (The Big Rudder Stars), contrasted with Ursa Minor, which is known as Sao Bánh lái nhỏ (The Little Rudder Stars). Although this name has now been replaced by the Sino-Vietnamese "Bắc Đẩu" in everyday speech, many coastal communities in central and southern Vietnam still refer to the asterism as such and use it to navigate when their fishing vessels return from the sea at night.

In Korea, the constellation was believed to be gods named Chilseong (칠성) that manage longevity. Some Buddhist temples in Korea enshrine the deity in chilseonggak (칠성각) or in samseonggak with Sansin and Dokseong.

In Shinto religion, the seven largest stars of Ursa Major belong to Ame-no-Minakanushi, the oldest and most powerful of all kami.

In Malay, it is known as the "Boat Constellation" (Buruj Biduk); in Indonesian, as the "Canoe Stars" (Bintang Biduk).

In Burmese, these stars are known as Pucwan Tārā (ပုဇွန် တာရာ, pronounced "bazun taja"). Pucwan (ပုဇွန်) is a general term for a crustacean, such as prawn, shrimp, crab, lobster, etc.

In Thai, they are known as the "Crocodile Stars" (ดาวจระเข้). 47 Ursae Majoris is also named Chalawan, the mythological crocodile from Thai folklore.

While its Western name comes from the star pattern's resemblance to a kitchen ladle, in Filipino, the Big Dipper and its sister constellation the Little Dipper are more often associated with the tabo, a one-handled water pot used ubiquitously in Filipino households and bathrooms for purposes of personal hygiene.

In the earliest Indian astronomy, the Big Dipper was called "the Bear" (Ṛkṣa, ऋक्ष) in the Rigveda, but was later more commonly known by the name of Saptarishi, "Seven Sages."

=== In North America and Greenland ===
The asterism name "Big Dipper" is mostly used in the United States and Canada. However, the origin of the term is disputed. A popular myth claimed the name originated from African-American folk songs; however, a more recent source challenges the authenticity of the claim.

In an 1824 book on the history of the constellations' mythology, Jacob Green contrasted the "Dipper or Ladle" descriptors used in the United States with "Charles's Wagon or Wain" which were common in England. Descriptions of "the dipper" appear in American astronomy textbooks throughout the 19th century.

According to Chris Cannon, "the Big Dipper is viewed as a caribou from Eastern Siberia across Alaska and Northern Canada to Greenland", that is throughout the Iñupiaq-Yup’ik-Aleut language family. Thus, in Inuit astronomy, this grouping of stars is referred to as "the Caribou" (Tukturjuit). Many of the stars within the constellation "were used as hour hands on the night sky to indicate hours of the night, or as calendar stars to help determine the date in fall, winter, or spring."

The name of a constellation at least partly corresponding to the Big Dipper is attested throughout the Dene languages. In Gwich'in, for example, the name is yahdii. (This name was also borrowed into Tlingit, as yaxhté.) Although dictionaries often report yahdii and related words as simply meaning "the Big Dipper", later research showed that in at least some cultures, yahdii was actually a constellation covering much of the sky; it was understood to represent either primordial creator-figure or a dangerous being that he defeated. The stars corresponding to the Big Dipper represent only the being's tail.

In Cree-speaking (Ininewuk) cultures, a number of constellations correspond to the Big Dipper. One name is Swampy Cree Ochekatchakosuk, meaning "fisher stars" deriving from the words for the fisher, ochek, and celestial bodies, atchakosuk. Having helped save the land from perpetual winter, the fisher is rewarded by the Creator by being made into a constellation; a similar story circulates in Anishinaabe culture. Another is Mista Musta ("the big bear"). In this case, the origin-story for the constellation is that a marauding bear is chased from the land by seven birds, so swiftly that all end up in the heavens. The constellation of the birds is called Tehpakoop Pinesisuk ("the Seven Birds") and corresponds to the Classical constellation Corona Borealis.

== Stars ==
Within Ursa Major the stars of the Big Dipper have Bayer designations in consecutive Greek alphabetical order from the bowl to the handle.

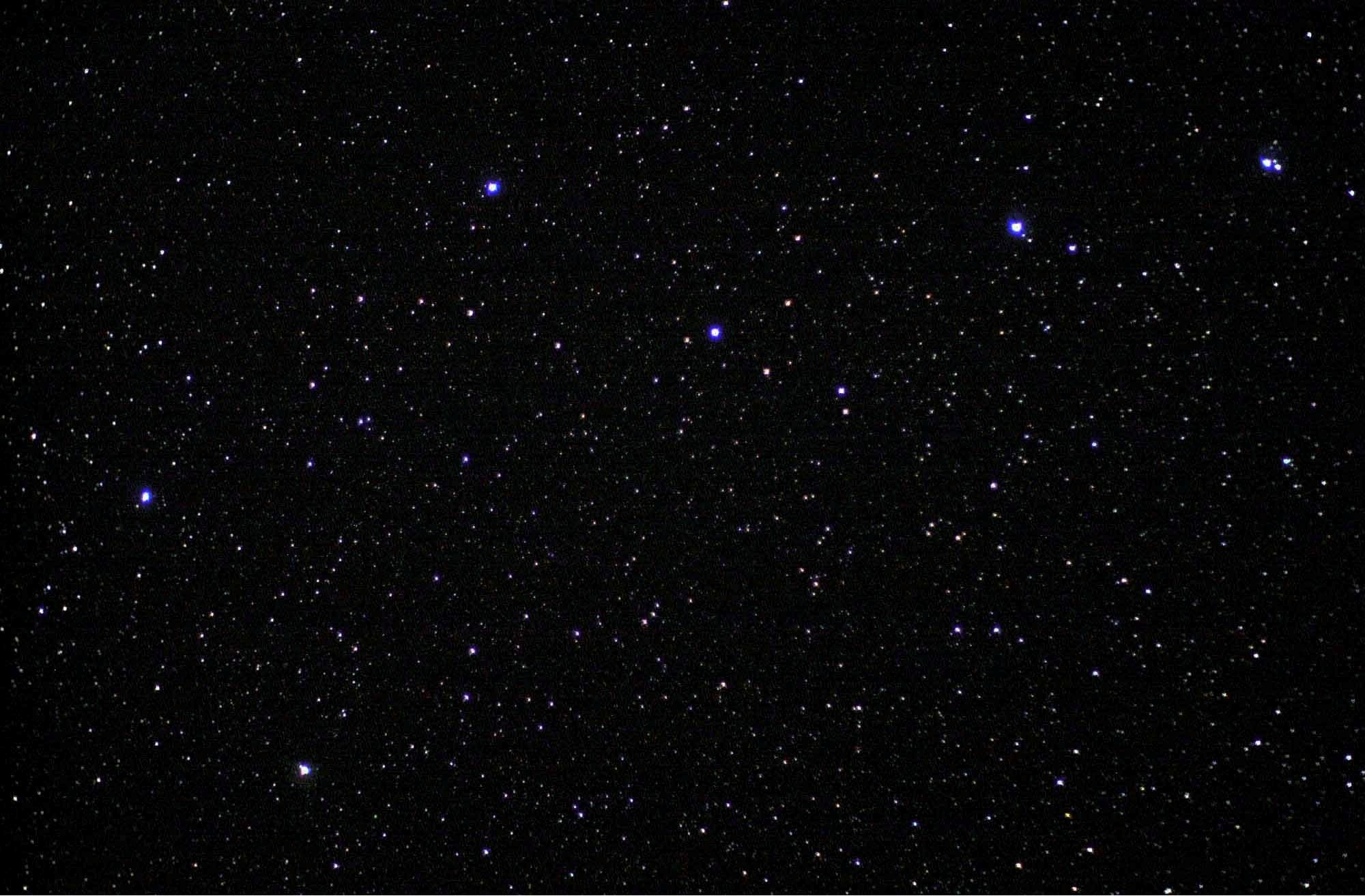
The Big Dipper's bowl and part of the handle photographed from the International Space Station. Mizar and Alcor are at the upper right.

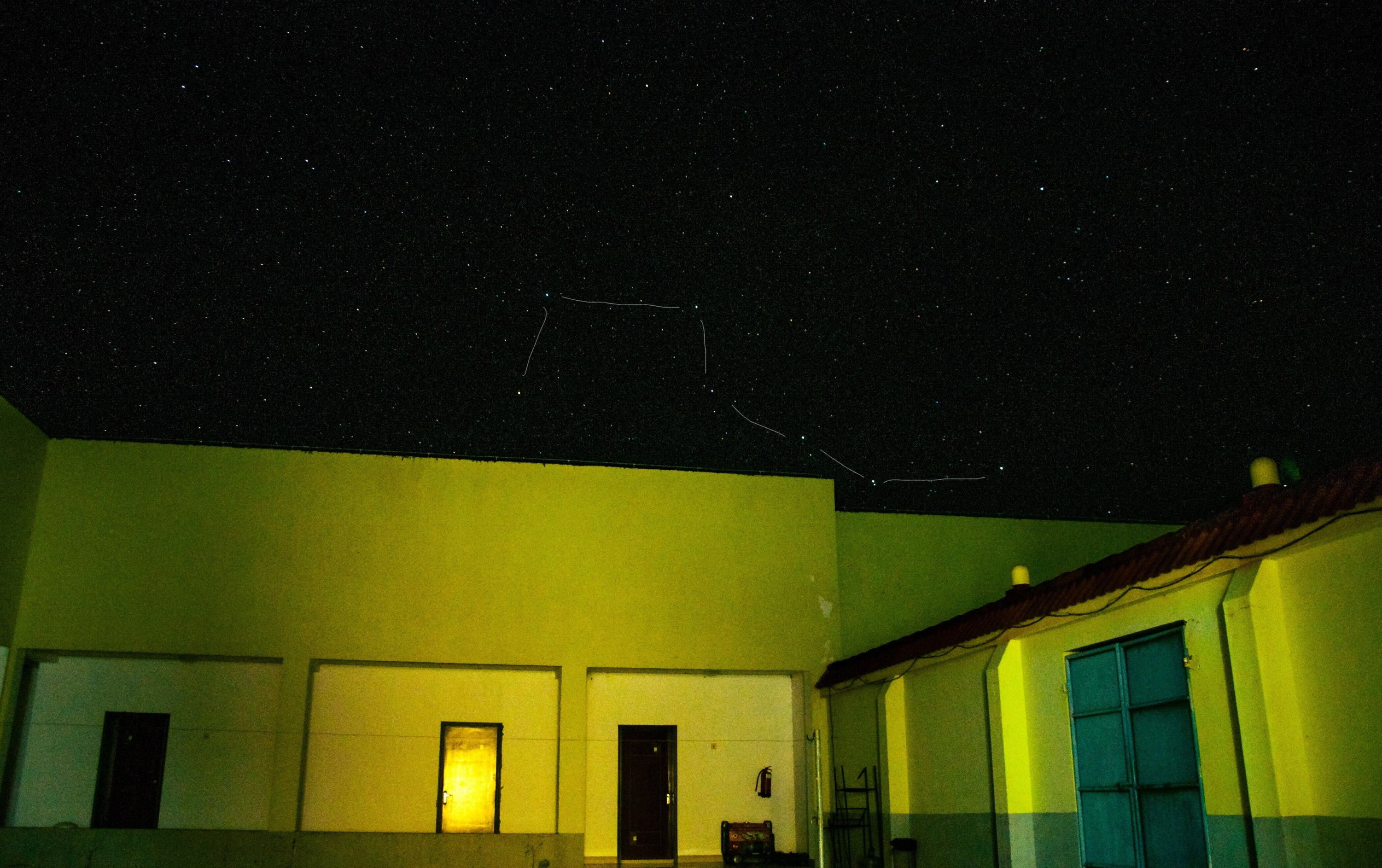
The Big Dipper (Ursa Major) photographed by Prof. Chen Hualin in Dakawa, Morogoro, Tanzania at midnight on 16 February 2018

Bayer designation	Proper Name	Apparent magnitude	Distance (l yrs)
α UMa	Dubhe	1.8	124
β UMa	Merak	2.4	79
γ UMa	Phecda	2.4	84
δ UMa	Megrez	3.3	81
ε UMa	Alioth	1.8	81
ζ UMa	Mizar	2.1	78
η UMa	Alkaid	1.9	104

In the same line of sight as Mizar, but about one light-year beyond it, is the star Alcor (80 UMa). Together they are known as the "Horse and Rider". At fourth magnitude, Alcor would normally be relatively easy to see with the unaided eye, but its proximity to Mizar renders it more difficult to resolve, and it has served as a traditional test of sight. Mizar itself has four components and thus enjoys the distinction of being part of an optical binary as well as being the first-discovered telescopic binary (1617) and the first-discovered spectroscopic binary (1889).

4D proper moving in -/+ 150 000 years. 3D red cyan glasses are recommended to view this image correctly.

Five of the stars of the Big Dipper are at the core of the Ursa Major Moving Group. The two at the ends, Dubhe and Alkaid, are not part of the swarm, and are moving in the opposite direction. Relative to the central five, they are moving down and to the right in the map. This will slowly change the Dipper's shape, with the bowl opening up and the handle becoming more bent. In 50,000 years the Dipper will no longer exist as we know it, but be re-formed into a new Dipper facing the opposite way. The stars Alkaid to Phecda will then constitute the bowl, while Phecda, Merak, and Dubhe will be the handle.

== Guidepost ==
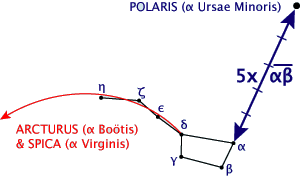
Guide to using Big Dipper to locate Arcturus, Spica, and Polaris

Not only are the stars in the Big Dipper easily found themselves, they may also be used as guides to other stars outside of the asterism. Thus it is often the starting point for introducing Northern Hemisphere beginners to the night sky:

- Polaris, the North Star, is found by imagining a line from Merak (β) to Dubhe (α) and then extending it for five times the distance between the two Pointers.
- Extending a line from Megrez (δ) to Phecda (γ), on the inside of the bowl, leads to Regulus (α Leonis) and Alphard (α Hydrae). A mnemonic for this is "A hole in the bowl will leak on Leo."
- Extending a line from Phecda (γ) to Megrez (δ) leads to Thuban (α Draconis), which was the pole star 4,000 years ago.
- Crossing the top of the bowl from Megrez (δ) to Dubhe (α) takes one in the direction of Capella (α Aurigae). A mnemonic for this is "Cap to Capella."
- Castor (α Geminorum) is reached by imagining a diagonal line from Megrez (δ) to Merak (β) and then extending it for approximately five times that distance.
- By following the curve of the handle from Alioth (ε) to Mizar (ζ) to Alkaid (η), one reaches Arcturus (α Boötis) and Spica (α Virginis). A mnemonic for this is "Arc to Arcturus then speed (or spike) to Spica."
- Projecting a line from Alkaid (η) through the pole star will point to Cassiopeia.

Additionally, the Dipper may be used as a guide to telescopic objects:

- The approximate location of the Hubble Deep Field can be found by following a line from Phecda (γ) to Megrez (δ) and continuing on for the same distance again.
- Crossing the bowl diagonally from Phecda (γ) to Dubhe (α) and proceeding onward for a similar stretch leads to the bright galaxy pair M81 and M82.
- Two spectacular spiral galaxies flank Alkaid (η), the Pinwheel (M101) to the north and the Whirlpool (M51) to the south.

== Cultural associations ==
The "Seven Stars" referenced in the Bible's Book of Amos may refer to these stars or, more likely, to the Pleiades.

Whilst the Arabs recognised the larger constellation of Ursa Major as being a bear, perhaps due to Greek influence, they had traditionally always recognised the Big Dipper and Ursa Minor as being counterparts. Both were imagined as funeral processions with the ladle of either seen as a coffin and its handle as a train of mourners. The Big Dipper is known as banāt an-na'sh al-kubrā meaning literally "the greater daughters of the bier". However daughters here means those pertaining to it, i.e., the mourners and thus is better translated as "the greater funeral procession", whilst Ursa Minor is known as "the lesser funeral procession". There is also a legend that the body on the bier is the father of those following it, who was killed by Polaris and whom the funeral procession is in pursuit of.

In traditional Hindu astronomy, the seven stars of the Big Dipper are identified with the names of the Saptarshi.

In addition, the asterism has also been used in corporate logos and the Alaska flag. The seven stars on a red background of the Flag of the Community of Madrid, Spain, are the stars of the Big Dipper Asterism. The same can be said about the seven stars pictured in the bordure azure of the Coat of arms of Madrid, capital city of Spain.

The asterism's prominence on the north of the night sky produced the adjective "septentrional" (literally, pertaining to seven plow oxen) in Romance languages and English, meaning "Northern [Hemisphere]".

"Follow the Drinkin' Gourd" is an African American folk song first published in 1928. The "Drinkin' Gourd" is thought to refer to the Big Dipper. Folklore has it that escaped southern slaves in the United States used the Big Dipper as a point of reference to go north.

A mythological origin of the asterism was described in a children's story which circulated in the United States in various versions. A version of this story taken from the pacifist magazine Herald of Peace was translated into Russian and incorporated into Leo Tolstoy's compilation A Calendar of Wisdom.

The Constellation was also used on the flag of the Italian Regency of Carnaro within the Ouroboros.

In the Disney cartoon "Gravity Falls", the main protagonist Dipper Pines's nickname came from the birthmark on his forehead, which takes the shape of the Big Dipper constellation.

The Big Dipper is a heavily associated motif in the manga and anime series Fist of the North Star, where it is the namesake of the titular martial art Hokuto Shinken.

Cultural depictions of the Big Dipper
The Starry Plough, used by Irish nationalists and Irish leftists.

The flag of Alaska, showing the Big Dipper and Polaris.

Flag of the former unrecognized state of the Italian Regency of Carnaro.

The historical coat of arms of Madrid, showing either the small or big dipper on a bear.

The coat of arms of Sweden, showing Big Dipper above the Napoleonic Eagle.

Flag of Coglais, a traditional district of Brittany.

The flag of the Missile Administration of North Korea, showing Big Dipper on hoist side.

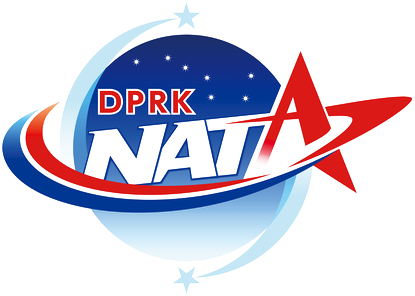
The logo of the National Aerospace Technology Administration of North Korea.

== See also ==
- Abenaki mythology
- Amenominakanushi
- Apkallu
- Beidou - Chinese global satellite navigation system named after the Big Dipper
- Saptarishi
- Seven Sages of Greece
- Swastika symbols
- Taidi
