= Megrez =

Star in the constellation Ursa Major

- Location of Megrez (circled)

Observation data Epoch J2000 Equinox ICRS
- Constellation: Ursa Major
- Right ascension: 12^{h} 15^{m} 25.56063^{s}
- Declination: +57° 01′ 57.4156″
- Apparent magnitude (V): +3.312

Characteristics
- Evolutionary stage: main sequence
- Spectral type: A3 V
- U−B color index: +0.067
- B−V color index: +0.075

Astrometry
Radial velocity (R_{v})	-20.2 km/s
Proper motion (μ)	RA: +104.11 mas/yr Dec.: 7.30 mas/yr
Parallax (π)	40.51±0.15 mas
Distance	80.5 ± 0.3 ly (24.69 ± 0.09 pc)
Absolute magnitude (M_{V})	+1.39

Details
Mass	2.062+0.020 −0.033 M_{☉}
Radius	2.512 (equatorial); 1.921 (polar) R_{☉}
Luminosity	23+1.24 −1.21 L_{☉}
Surface gravity (log g)	4.49 cgs
Temperature	6,909 (equatorial); 10,030 (polar) K
Rotational velocity (v sin i)	244.6+11.6 −11.1 km/s
Age	414+35 −43 Myr

Other designations
- Megrez, δ UMa, 69 UMa, BD+57 1363, FK5 456, GC 16736, GJ 459, HD 106591, HIP 59774, HR 4660, SAO 28315, PPM 33469, CCDM J12155+5702A, WDS J12154+5702A, IDS 12105+5735 A

Database references
SIMBAD	data

Megrez /ˈmiːɡrɛz/, also called Delta Ursae Majoris (δ Ursae Majoris, abbreviated Delta UMa, δ UMa), is a star in the northern constellation of Ursa Major. With an apparent magnitude of +3.3, it is the dimmest of the seven stars in the Big Dipper asterism. Parallax measurements yield a distance estimate of 80.5 light-years (24.7 parsecs) from the Sun.

== Stellar properties ==
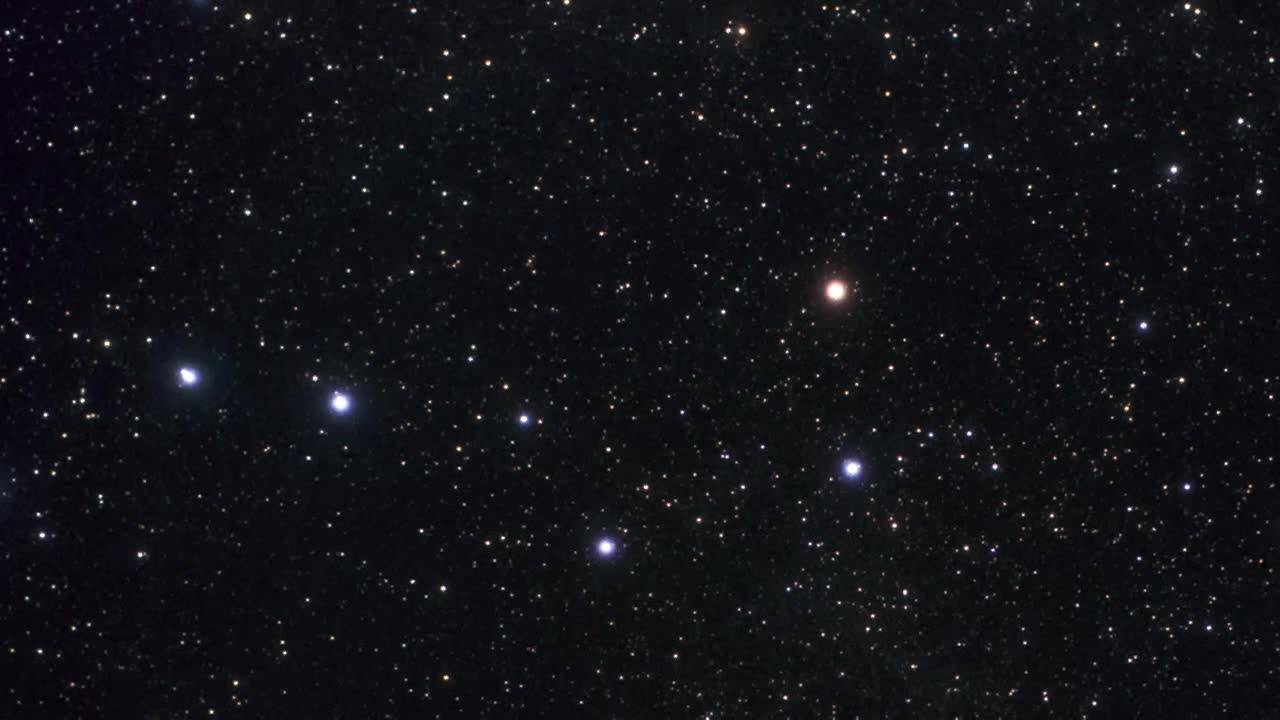
The Big Dipper with Delta Ursae Majoris

Megrez has two times more mass than the Sun and is about 23 times more luminous. It has a stellar classification of A3 V, which means it is an A-type main sequence star that is generating energy at its core through the nuclear fusion of hydrogen. It rotates rapidly, taking 3.1 hours to complete a rotation across its equator, causing Megrez to have an oblate shape and hotter temperatures at the poles due to gravity darkening.

This star has an excess emission of infrared radiation, indicating the presence of circumstellar matter. This forms a debris disk around an orbital radius of 16 astronomical units from the star. This radius is unusually small for the estimated age of the disk, which may be explained by drag from the Poynting–Robertson effect causing the dust to spiral inward.

It has two faint companions, a 10th magnitude star and an 11th magnitude star, both at an angular separation of two arcminutes from the primary.

Delta Ursae Majoris is a member of the Ursa Major moving group, an association of stars that share a common motion through space and likely formed in the same molecular cloud. The space velocity components of Delta Ursae Majoris in the galactic coordinate system are [U, V, W] = [+15.35, +1.17, –11.52] km s^{−1}.

== Nomenclature ==
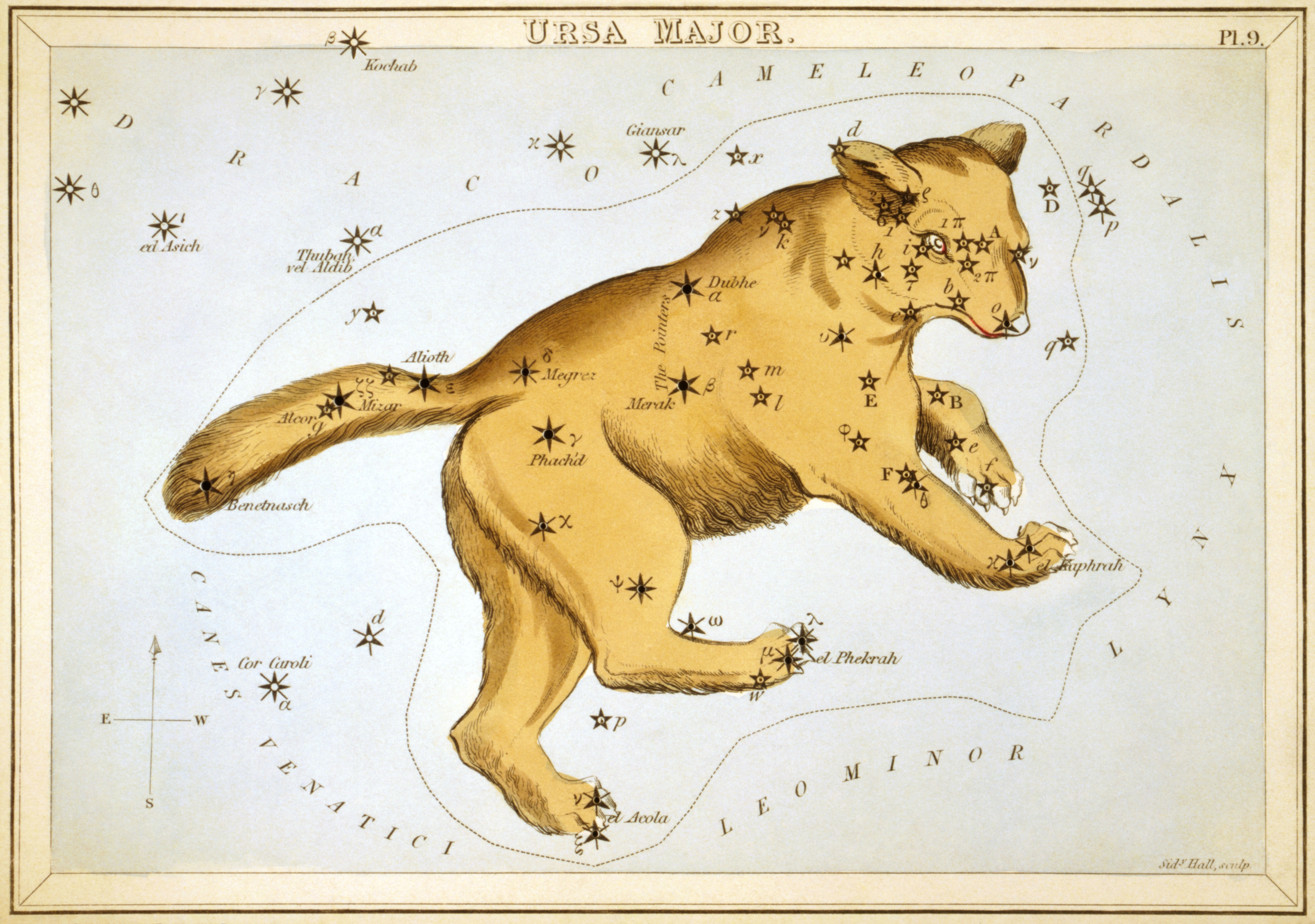
Book plate by Sydney Hall depicting Ursa Major's stars

δ Ursae Majoris (Latinised to Delta Ursae Majoris) is the star's Bayer designation.

It bore the traditional name Megrez /ˈmɛɡrɛz/ and the historical name Kaffa. Megrez comes from the Arabic: المغرز al-maghriz 'the base [of the bear's tail]'. Professor Paul Kunitzch has been unable to find any clues as to the origin of the name Kaffa, which appeared in a 1951 publication, Atlas Coeli (Skalnate Pleso Atlas of the Heavens) by Czech astronomer Antonín Bečvář.

In 2016, the IAU organized a Working Group on Star Names (WGSN) to catalog and standardize proper names for stars. The WGSN decided to attribute proper names to individual stars rather than entire multiple systems. It approved the name Megrez for the component Delta Ursae Majoris Aa on June 6th 2016 and it is now so included in the List of IAU-approved Star Names.

The Hindus knew δ Ursae Majoris as Atri, one of the Seven Rishis.

In Chinese, 北斗 (Běi Dǒu), meaning Northern Dipper, refers to an asterism equivalent to the Big Dipper. Consequently, the Chinese name for Delta Ursae Majoris itself is 北斗四 (Běi Dǒu sì, English: the Fourth Star of Northern Dipper) and 天權 (Tiān Quán, English: Star of Celestial Balance).

== Namesakes ==
USS Megrez (AK-126) was a United States Navy Crater class cargo ship named after the star.
