= Dubhe =

Binary star in the constellation Ursa Major

- Location of Dubhe (circled)

Observation data Epoch J2000 Equinox J2000
- Constellation: Ursa Major
- Pronunciation: see text
- Right ascension: 11^{h} 03^{m} 43.67152^{s}
- Declination: +61° 45′ 03.7249″
- Apparent magnitude (V): 1.79 (1.87 + 4.85)

Characteristics
- Spectral type: K0III + A5V
- U−B color index: +0.93
- B−V color index: +1.07
- Variable type: Suspected

Astrometry
Radial velocity (R_{v})	−9.4±0.3 km/s
Proper motion (μ)	RA: –134.11 mas/yr Dec.: –34.70 mas/yr
Parallax (π)	26.54±0.48 mas
Distance	123 ± 2 ly (37.7 ± 0.7 pc)
Absolute magnitude (M_{V})	−1.10±0.04

Orbit
Secondary	α UMa B
Period (P)	44.45±0.11 yr
Semi-major axis (a)	0.590±0.026″
Eccentricity (e)	0.439±0.004
Inclination (i)	159.9±3.5°
Longitude of the node (Ω)	9.3±8.2°
Periastron epoch (T)	2,002.17±0.09
Argument of periastron (ω) (secondary)	232.8±7.9°

Details

α UMa A
Mass	3.7±0.4 M_{☉}
Radius	27.33+0.49 −0.50 R_{☉}
Luminosity	339 L_{☉}
Surface gravity (log g)	2.22 cgs
Temperature	4,810±22 K
Metallicity [Fe/H]	–0.15 dex
Rotation	<1.35 years
Rotational velocity (v sin i)	2.63±0.15 km/s
Age	280±30 Myr

α UMa B
Mass	2.5±0.4 M_{☉}

Other designations
- Dubhe, Ak, α Ursae Majoris, α UMa, Alpha UMa, 50 UMa, NSV 5070, BD+62°1161, FK5 417, GC 15185, HD 95689, HIP 54061, HR 4301, SAO 15384, PPM 17705, ADS 8035, CCDM J11037+6145AB, WDS J11037+6145AB

Database references
SIMBAD	data

Dubhe (see pronunciation) is a multiple star system in the northern constellation of Ursa Major. It is formally designated Alpha Ursae Majoris, Latinised from α Ursae Majoris, Despite being designated "α" (alpha), it is the second-brightest object in the constellation. Alpha Ursae Majoris is the northern of the 'pointers' (or 'guards'), the second being Beta Ursae Majoris, or 'Merak' – this pair of stars point towards Polaris, the North Star. α Ursae Majoris is located at a distance of approximately 123 light years from the Sun, based on parallax measurements.

Although it is part of the constellation of Ursa Major, it is not part of the Ursa Major Moving Group of stars that have a common motion through space.

== Components ==
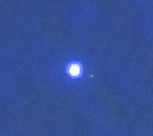
α Ursae Majoris A and faint companion binaries

Dubhe is a spectroscopic binary made up of the stars α Ursae Majoris A and α Ursae Majoris B. The pair orbit at a separation of about 23 astronomical units (AU), with a period of 44.5 years and an eccentricity of 0.44. There is another spectroscopic binary at an angular separation of 7.1 arcminutes, forming a 7th magnitude pair showing an F8 spectral type with an orbital period of 6.035 days and an eccentricity of 0.09. It is sometimes referred to as Alpha Ursae Majoris C, but is separately catalogued as HD 95638. Together they form a quadruple star system.

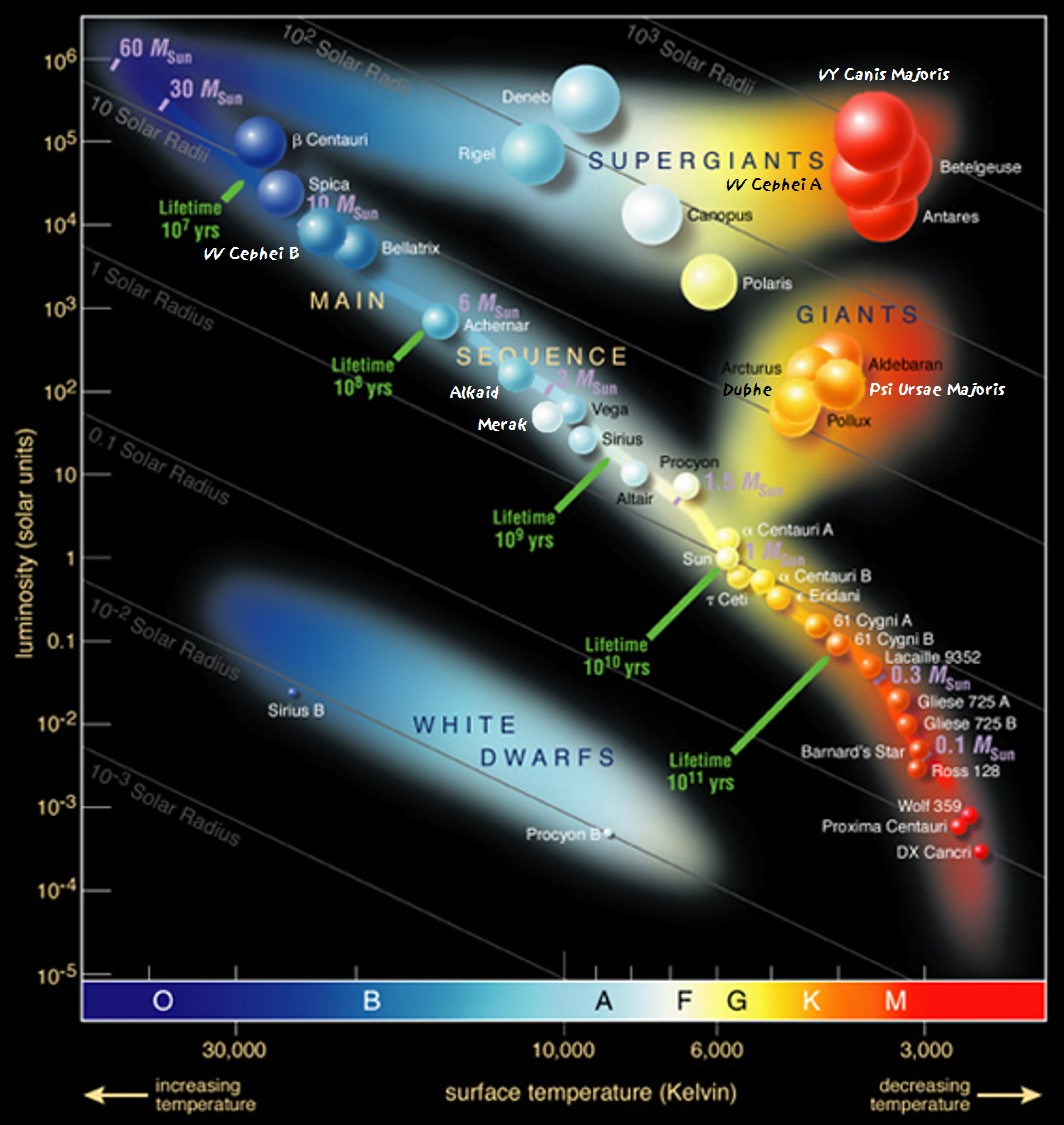
A Hertzsprung–Russell diagram showing the position of Dubhe on the red-giant branch

Component A is the system's primary, and it has a stellar classification of K0III. This is a giant star that has evolved away from the main sequence after consuming the hydrogen at its core. It is 280 million years old with 3.7 times the Sun's mass and has expanded 27 times the radius of the Sun. The star is radiating 340 times the luminosity of the Sun from its enlarged photosphere at an effective temperature of 4,800 K. The secondary star, component B, is an A-type main-sequence star that has a class of A5V. α Ursae Majoris has been reported to vary in brightness by about a thousandth of a magnitude. Ten radial oscillation modes have been detected, with periods between 6.4 hours and 6.4 days.

In addition to the inner pair, a widely-separated star has been reported as having similar proper motions with Dubhe, and thus may form a gravitationally bound system. However, the chance of it being unrelated is around 40%, leaving its membership to Dubhe uncertain.

== Nomenclature ==
α Ursae Majoris (Latinised to Alpha Ursae Majoris) is the star system's Bayer designation.

It bore the traditional name Dubhe, which is derived from the Arabic for 'bear', dubb, from the phrase ظهر الدب الاكبر, żahr ad-dubb al-akbar 'the back of the Greater Bear'. The ancient Egyptians called it Ak, meaning 'The Eye'. In 2016, the International Astronomical Union organized a Working Group on Star Names (WGSN) to catalog and standardize proper names for stars. The WGSN's first bulletin of July 2016 included a table of the first two batches of names approved by the WGSN; which included Dubhe for the star α Ursae Majoris A. In English, Dubhe has traditionally been pronounced /ˈduːbhɛ/, but is now also pronounced /ˈdʌbiː/

The Hindus refer to the star as Kratu, one of the Seven Rishis.

In Chinese, 北斗 Běi Dǒu, meaning Northern Dipper, refers to an asterism equivalent to the Big Dipper. Consequently, the Chinese name for Alpha Ursae Majoris itself is 北斗一 Běi Dǒu yī, (English: the First Star of Northern Dipper) and 天樞 Tiān Shū, (English: Star of Celestial Pivot).

== In culture ==
Dubhe is the official star of the State of Utah.

Dubhe was a ship in the United States Navy. The Danish National Home Guard Navy ship MHV806 is also named Dubhe.

== See also ==
- Lists of stars by constellation
