= NGC 3432 =

Galaxy in the constellation Leo Minor

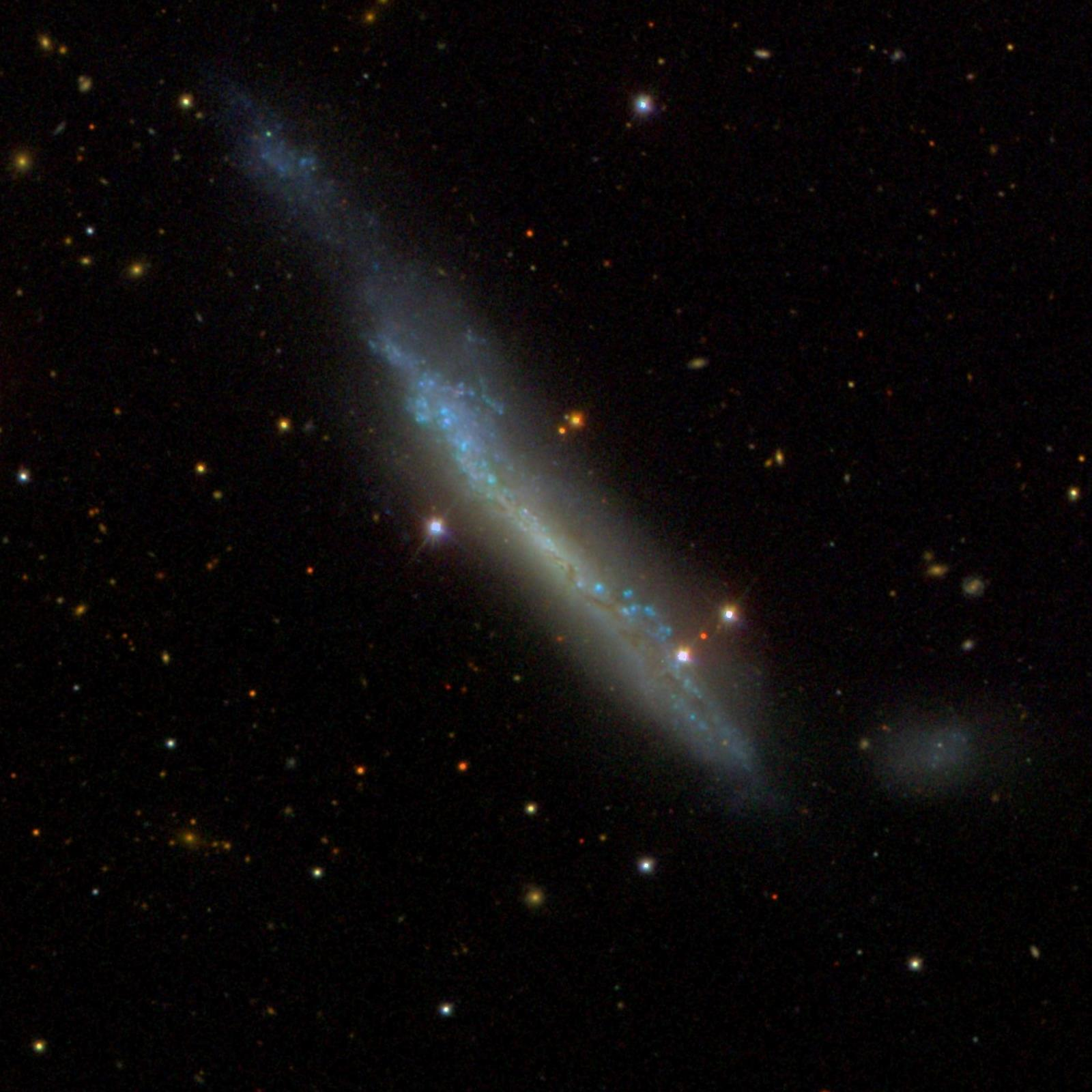
- SDSS DR14 image of NGC 3432

Observation data (J2000 epoch)
- Constellation: Leo Minor
- Right ascension: 10^{h} 52^{m} 31.132^{s}
- Declination: +36° 37′ 07.60″
- Redshift: 0.002055
- Heliocentric radial velocity: 613
- Distance: 40.1 ± 5.8 Mly (12.30 ± 1.77 Mpc)
- Apparent magnitude (V): 11.3
- Magnitude (J): 9.910
- Magnitude (H): 9.286
- Magnitude (K): 9.061

Characteristics
- Type: SB(s)m
- Size: ~98,000 ly (30.05 kpc) (estimated)
- Apparent size (V): 6.5′ × 1.1′

Other designations
- IRAS 10497+3653, NGC 3432, Arp 206, UGC 5986, MCG +06-24-028, PGC 32643, CGCG 184-030, VV 011a

NGC 3432, also known as the Knitting Needle Galaxy, is an edge-on spiral galaxy that can be found in the northern constellation of Leo Minor. It was discovered by German-British astronomer William Herschel on March 19, 1787. This galaxy is located at a distance of 40 million light-years (12.3 Mpc) from the Milky Way. It is interacting with UGC 5983, a nearby dwarf galaxy, and features tidal filaments and intense star formation. Because of these features, it was listed in Halton Arp's Atlas of Peculiar Galaxies.

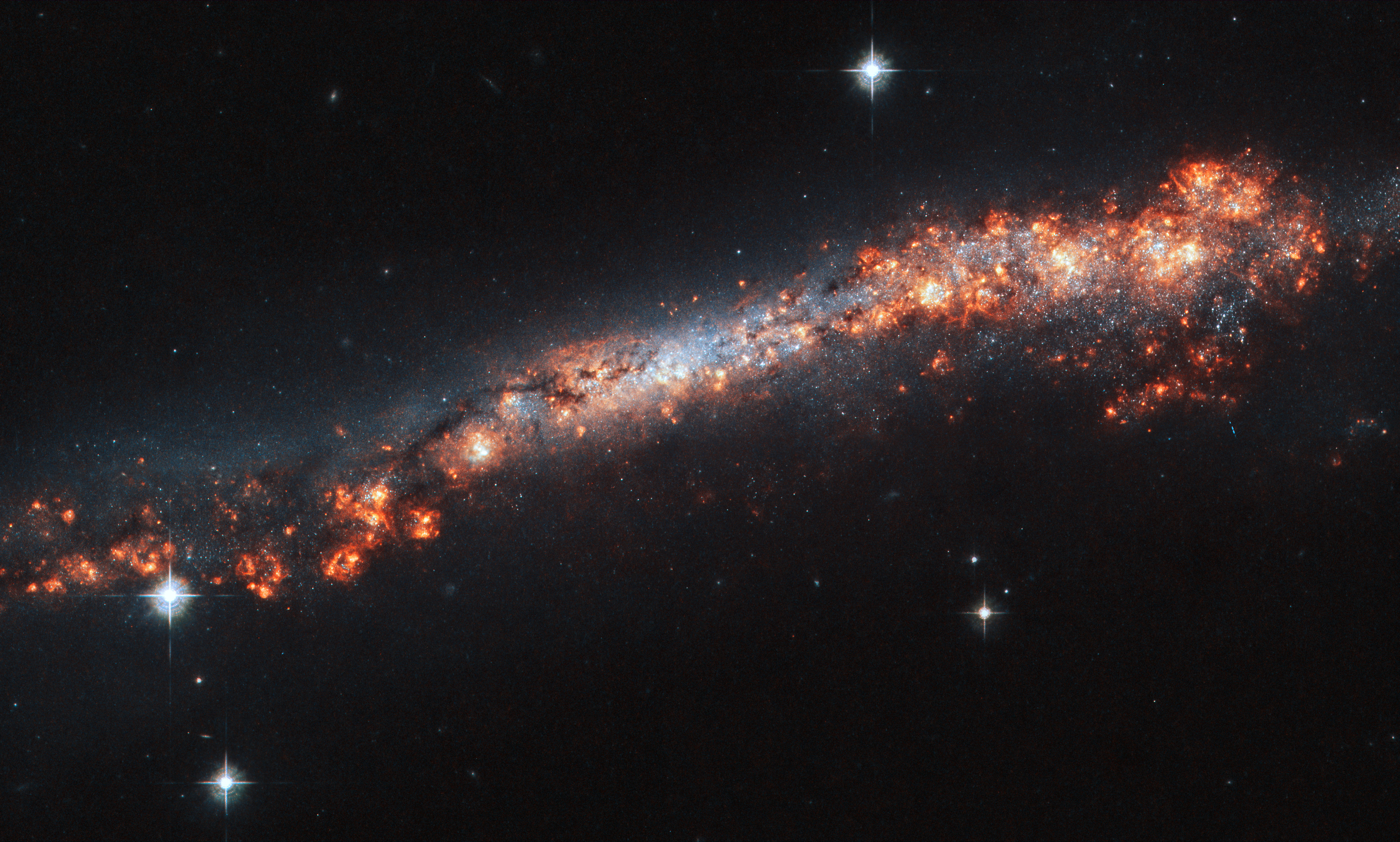
Hubble image of NGC 3432 showing regions of star formation

The morphological classification of NGC 3432 is SB(s)m, which indicates this is a barred Magellanic spiral galaxy (SB) with no inner ring structure (s) and an irregular appearance (m). The galaxy is inclined at an angle of 85°±2° to the plane of the sky with its major axis along a positional angle of 38°, which means it is being viewed from nearly edge-on. It is interacting with the companion galaxy UGC 5983, which is creating features that extend outside the galactic plane, as well as an extended halo of radio emission. The shape of the galaxy is distorted and two tidal tails have been identified. NGC 3432 has an active galactic nucleus of the LINER type with a nuclear HII region.

In May 3, 2000, a candidate nova was detected in this galaxy. It was located 123″ east and 180″ north of the galactic nucleus, and aligned with an H II region (or spiral arm) of the galaxy. This appeared similar to a Type IIn supernova (designated SN 2000ch), but it peaked below the typical luminosity of these events. As such, it may have been a "superoutburst" of a luminous variable and thus it could have survived the event. The outburst was found comparable to an eruption of Eta Carinae in the mid–nineteenth century. Multiple subsequent outbursts were observed in 2008 and 2009. It is now classified as a supernova impostor, and is expected to become a core collapse supernova in the future.

NGC 3432 is located in the low density environment near the Lynx-Cancer Void, along with many other galaxies such as NGC 2543, NGC 3041, NGC 3344, NGC 3239, NGC 3198, NGC 3319 and NGC 3365. Galaxies within the Lynx-Cancer Voidare NGC 2500, NGC 2537, NGC 2541, NGC 2552, NGC 2337 and IC 2450.

== See also ==
- List of NGC objects (3001–4000)
