= NGC 3344 =

Galaxy in the constellation Leo Minor

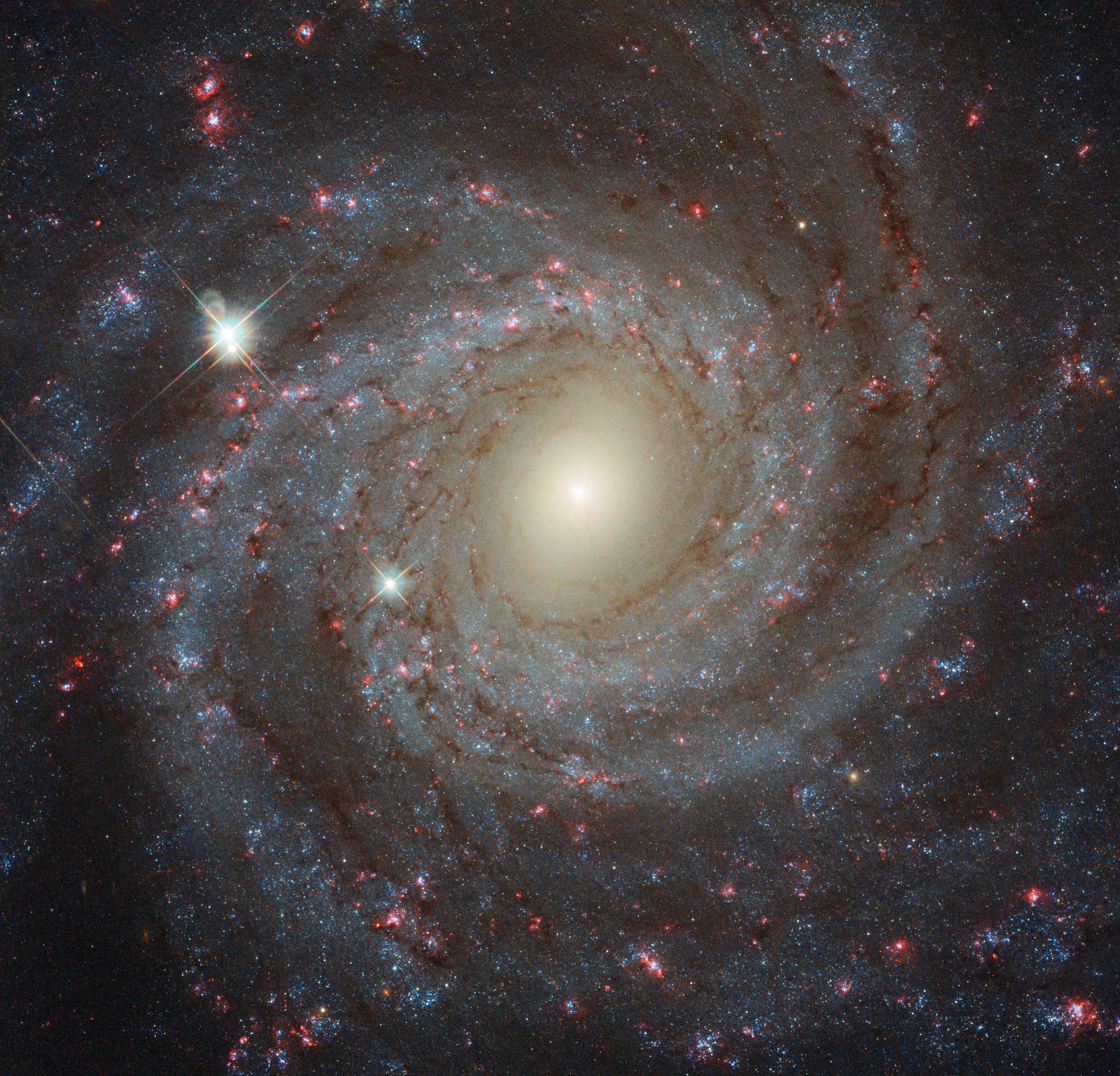
- NGC 3344 imaged by the Hubble Space Telescope

Observation data (J2000 epoch)
- Constellation: Leo Minor
- Right ascension: 10^{h} 43^{m} 31.150^{s}
- Declination: +24° 55′ 19.99″
- Heliocentric radial velocity: 585 km/s
- Distance: 22.5 Mly (6.9 Mpc)
- Apparent magnitude (V): 9.7
- Magnitude (J): 8.196
- Magnitude (H): 7.647
- Magnitude (K): 7.437

Characteristics
- Type: (R)SAB(r)bc
- Size: ~84,800 ly (26.01 kpc) (estimated)
- Apparent size (V): 7.1′ × 6.5′
- Notable features: Emission-Line galaxy

Other designations
- IRAS 10407+2511, UGC 5840, MCG +04-25-046, PGC 31968, CGCG 124-060

NGC 3344 is a relatively isolated barred spiral galaxy in the constellation of Leo Minor. It was discovered by German-British astronomer William Herschel on 6 April 1785. This galaxy is located at a distance of 22.5 million light-years (6.9 Mpc) from the Milky Way. It has an apparent visual magnitude of 9.7 and spans an angular size of 7.1′ × 6.5′. The nearest bright galaxy is NGC 3274 at a projected separation of 3.7°. NGC 3344 belongs to the galaxy group known as the Leo spur, which is a branch of the Virgo Supercluster.

The morphological classification of NGC 3344 is (R)SAB(r)bc, which indicates it is a barred spiral galaxy (SAB) that exhibits rings (R, r) and moderate to loosely wound spiral arms (bc). The plane of the galaxy is inclined at an angle of around 25.5° with the long angle of the resulting elliptical shape aligned along a position angle of −23.9°. There is both an inner ring and outer pseudo-ring, with the prominent arms radiating outward from the inner ring and the relatively small and slightly elliptical bar being situated inside. At the center of the bar is an H II nucleus with an angular diameter of about 3″.

NGC 3344 is located in the low density environment near the Lynx-Cancer Void, along with many other galaxies such as NGC 2543, NGC 3041, NGC 3239, NGC 3198, NGC 3319 and NGC 3365. Galaxies within the Lynx-Cancer Void are NGC 2500, NGC 2537, NGC 2541, NGC 2552, NGC 2337 and IC 2450.

== Supernova ==
One supernova has been observed in NGC 3344: SN 2012fh, a Type Ib/Ic that peaked at magnitude 15.1. It was discovered by Masaki Tsuboi on 18 October 2012.
