= NGC 3198 =

Galaxy in the constellation Ursa Major

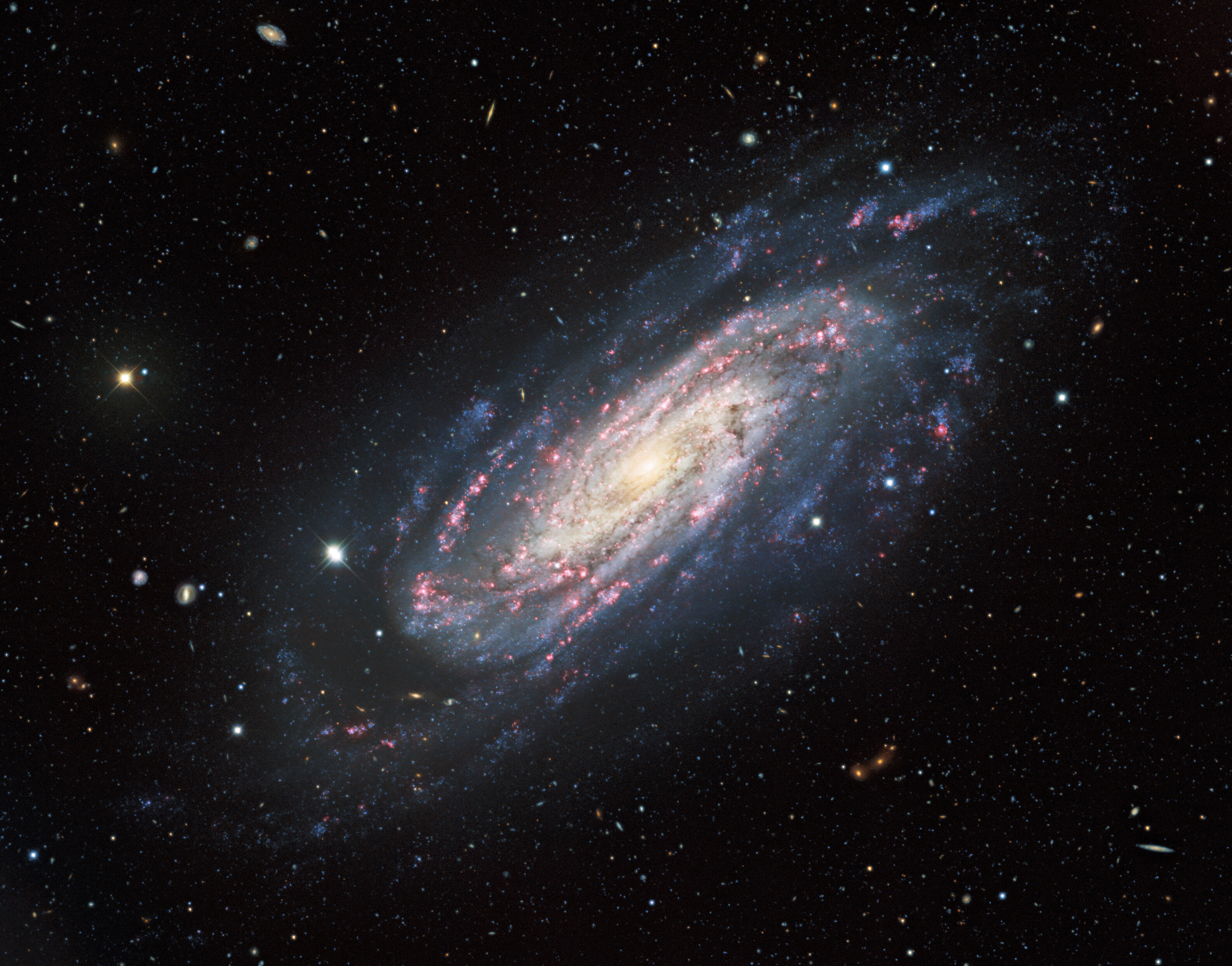
- NGC 3198 imaged by the Nicholas U. Mayall Telescope

Observation data (J2000 epoch)
- Constellation: Ursa Major
- Right ascension: 10^{h} 19^{m} 55.0022^{s}
- Declination: +45° 32′ 59.337″
- Redshift: 0.00227
- Distance: 47 Mly
- Apparent magnitude (V): 10.3

Characteristics
- Type: SB(rs)c
- Size: ~121,800 ly (37.33 kpc) (estimated)
- Apparent size (V): 8.5′ × 3.3′

Other designations
- IRAS 10168+4548, UGC 5572, MCG +08-19-020, PGC 30197, CGCG 240-030

NGC 3198, also known as Herschel 146 is a barred spiral galaxy in the constellation Ursa Major. It was discovered by German-British astronomer William Herschel on 15 January 1788. NGC 3198 is located in the Leo Spur, which is part of the Virgo Supercluster, and is approximately 47 million light years away.

NGC 3198 was one of 18 galaxies targeted by the Hubble Space Telescope (HST) Key Project on the Extragalactic Distance Scale, which aimed to calibrate various secondary distance indicators and determine the Hubble constant to an accuracy of 10%. The type and orientation of NGC 3198 made it suitable for these measurements. The Wide Field and Planetary Camera 2 (WFPC2) of the HST was used to measure the magnitudes of 52 Cepheid variables, and the resulting distance modulus corresponded to a distance of 14.5 Mpc (47 million light years).

Observations made with the Westerbork Synthesis Radio Telescope detected for the first time the presence of extraplanar gas. The extraplanar gas makes up approximately 15% of the total atomic hydrogen (HI) mass of the galaxy.

NGC 3198 is located in the low density environment near the Lynx-Cancer Void, along with many other galaxies such as NGC 2543, NGC 3041, NGC 3344, NGC 3239, NGC 3319 and NGC 3365. Galaxies within the Lynx-Cancer Void are NGC 2500, NGC 2537, NGC 2541, NGC 2552, NGC 2337 and IC 2450.

== Supernovae ==
Two supernovae have been observed in NGC 3198:

- SN 1966J (Type Ia, mag. 13) was discovered by Paul Wild on 18 December 1966. Some sources list this supernova as a Type Ib.
- SN 1999bw (type gap, mag. 17.8) was discovered by the Lick Observatory Supernova Search (LOSS) on 20 April 1999. Significantly fainter than expected when discovered, it was initially classified as a Type IIn supernova. In 2021, researchers reclassified it as a gap transient.

== Gallery ==
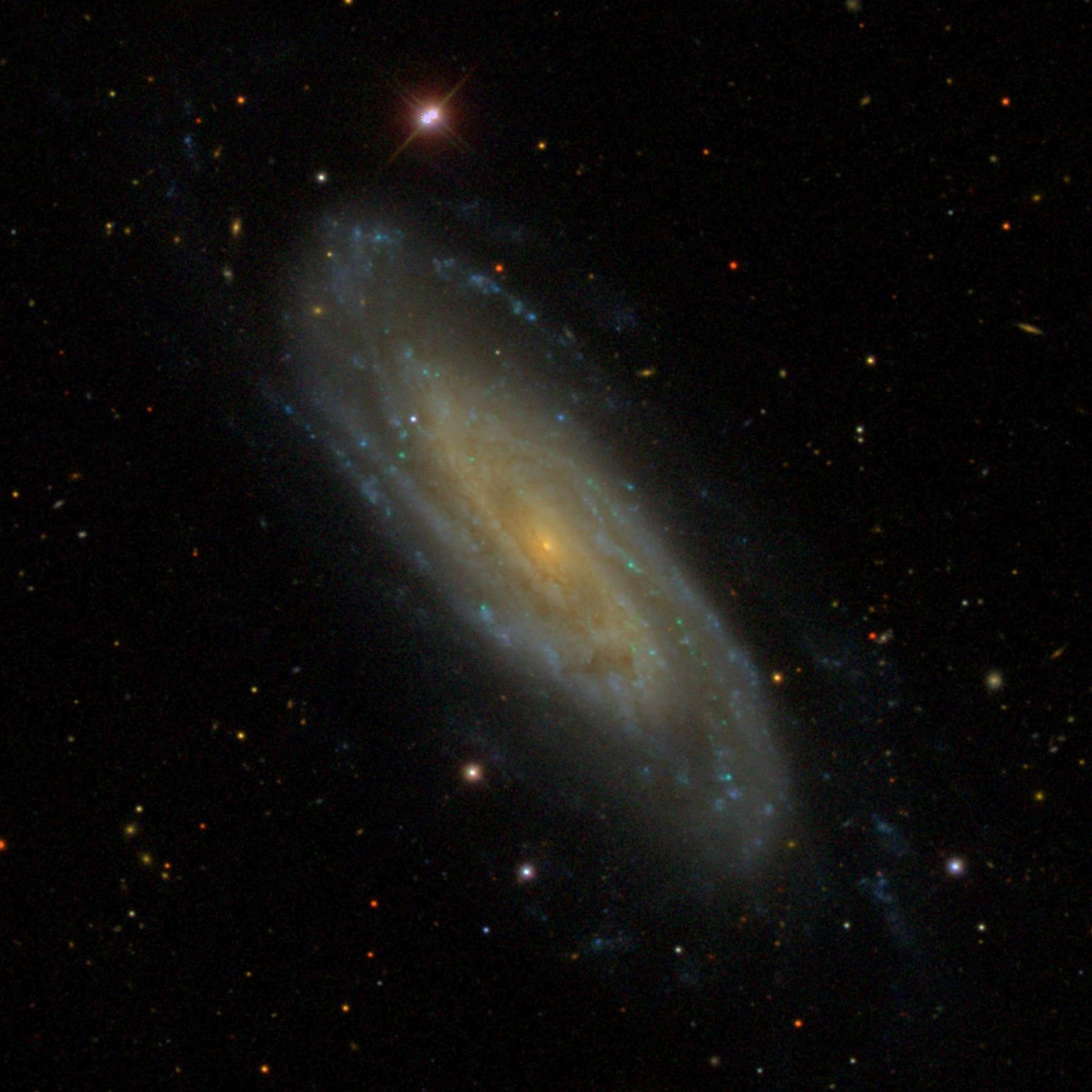
NGC 3198 imaged by the Sloan Digital Sky Survey

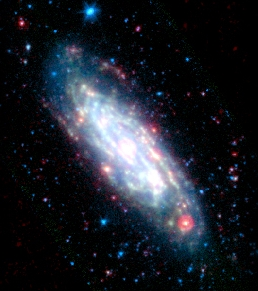
NGC 3198 imaged by the Spitzer Space Telescope

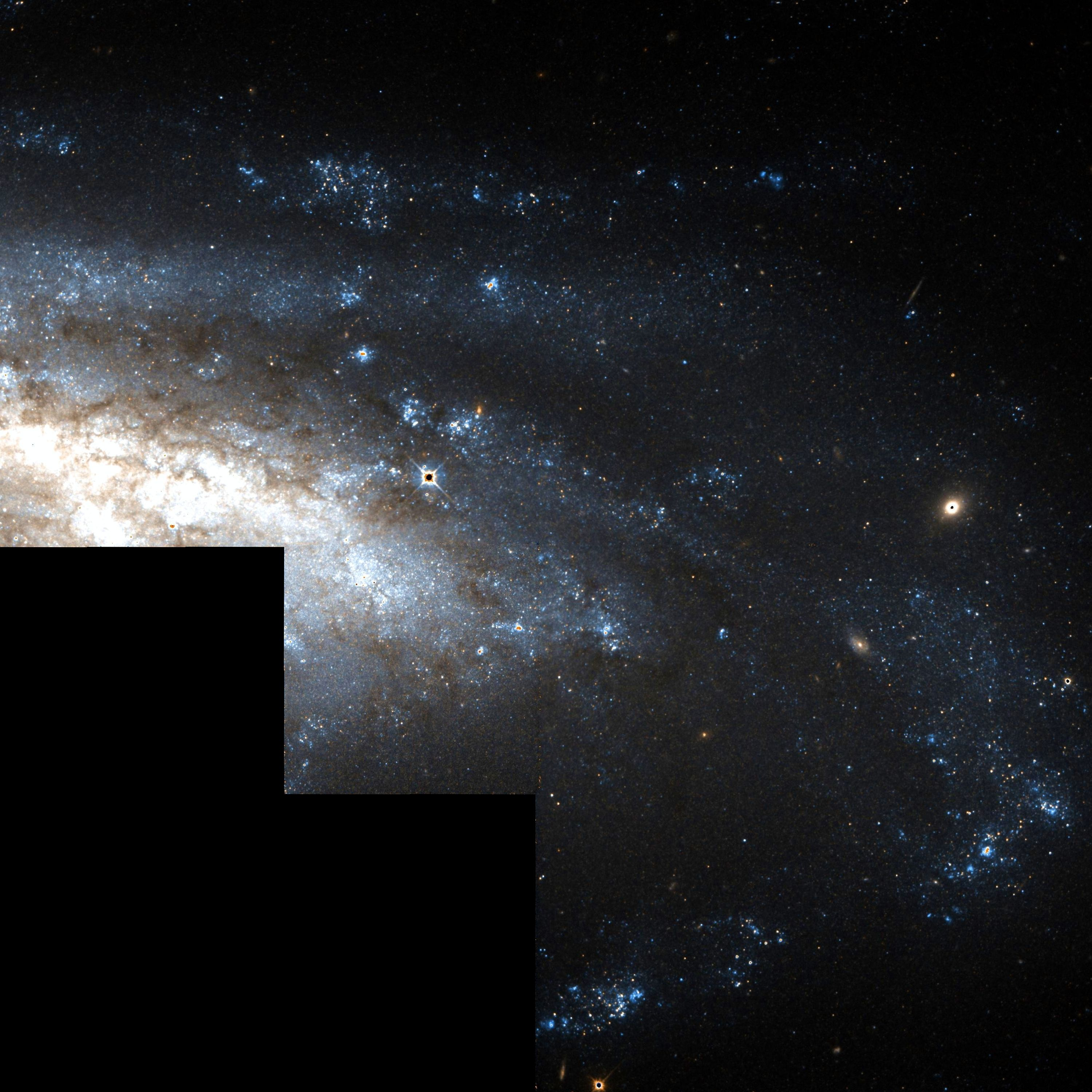
NGC 3198 imaged by the Hubble Space Telescope

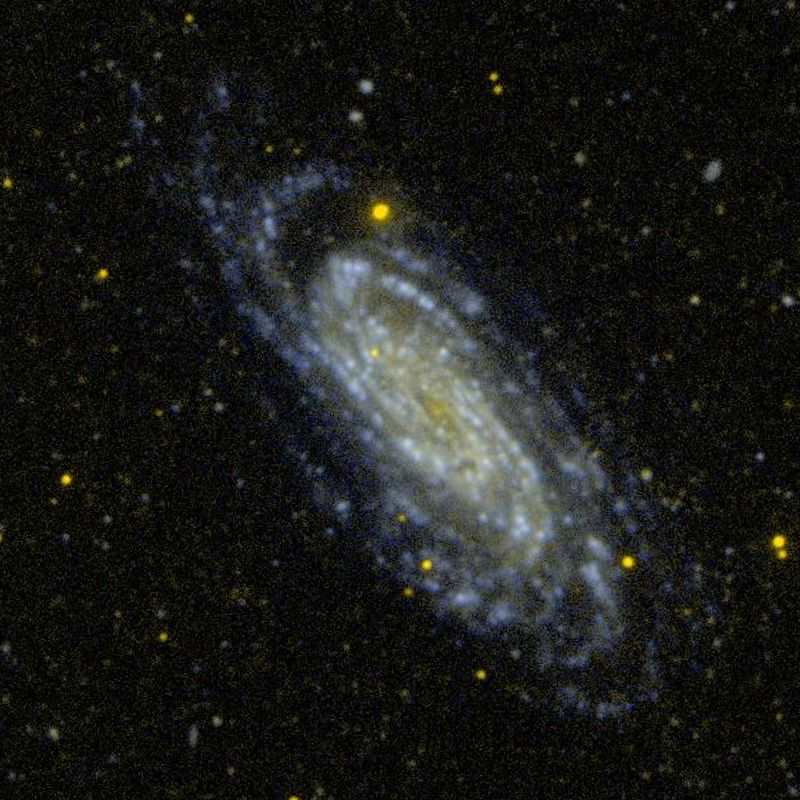
NGC 3198 imaged by GALEX (ultraviolet)

== See also ==
- List of NGC objects (3001–4000)
