= NGC 3041 =

Galaxy in the constellation Leo

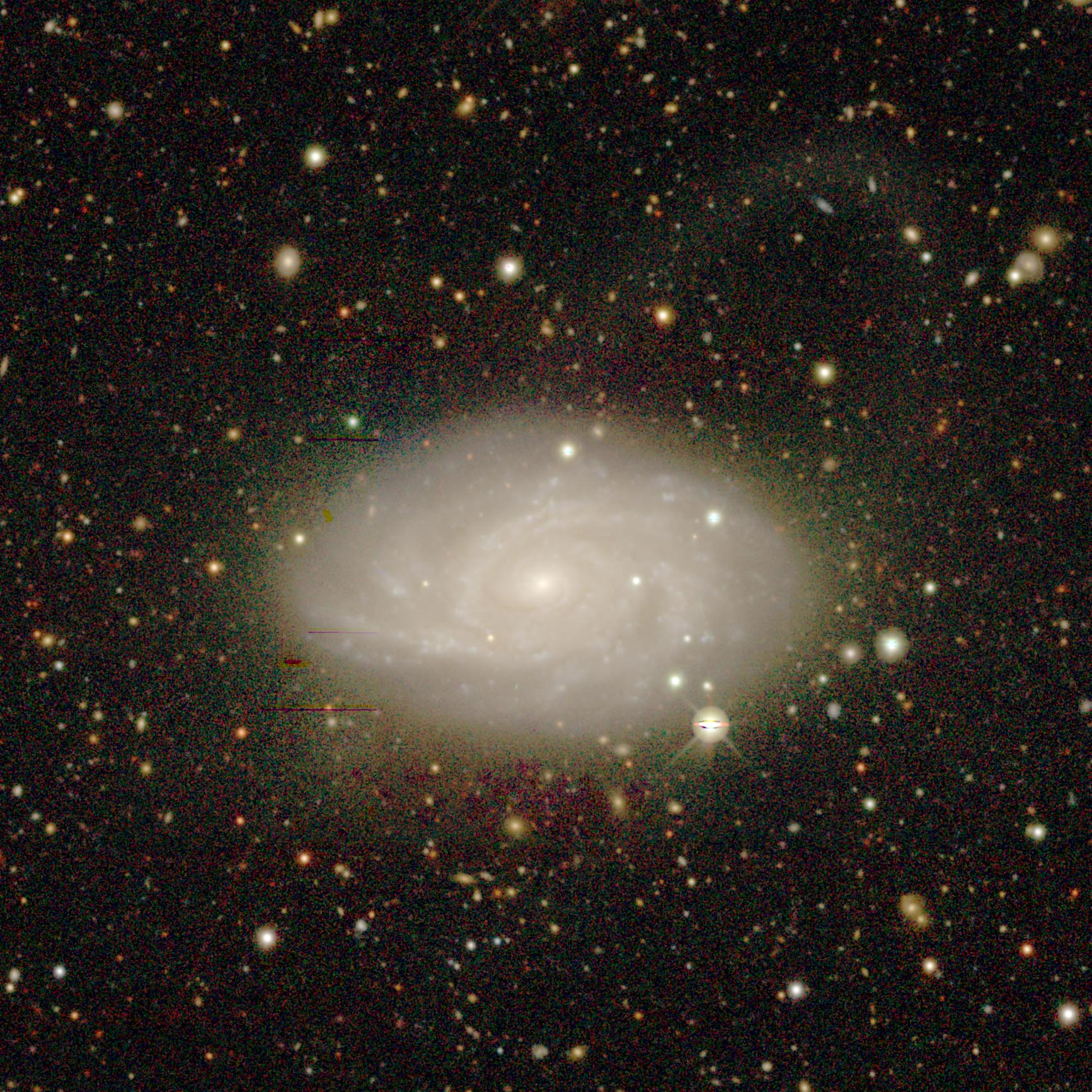

Observation data (J2000 epoch)
- Constellation: Leo
- Right ascension: 09^{h} 53^{m} 7.1^{s}
- Declination: +16° 40′ 40″
- Redshift: 0.004697±0.000007
- Heliocentric radial velocity: 1408±2 km/s
- Galactocentric velocity: 1313±4 km/s
- Apparent magnitude (V): 10.36
- Absolute magnitude (V): -21.58

Characteristics
- Type: SAB(rs)c
- Apparent size (V): 3.7′ × 2.4′

Other designations
- UGC 5303, MCG 3-25-39, ZWG 92.68, PGC 28485 and IRAS 09503+1654
- References: NASA/IPAC extragalactic datatbase

NGC 3041 is an intermediate barred spiral galaxy located in the constellation Leo. It is categorized as SAB(rs)c in the galaxy morphological classification scheme. It was discovered by William Herschel on 23 March 1784. The galaxy is approximately 77 million light years away from earth.

NGC 3041 is located in the low density environment near the Lynx-Cancer Void, along with many other galaxies such as NGC 2543, NGC 3344, NGC 3239, NGC 3198, NGC 3319 and NGC 3365. Galaxies within the Lynx-Cancer Void are NGC 2500, NGC 2537, NGC 2541, NGC 2552, NGC 2337 and IC 2450.

== See also ==
- List of NGC objects (3001–4000)
- List of NGC objects
- List of spiral galaxies
