= NGC 3239 =

Irregular galaxy the constellation Leo

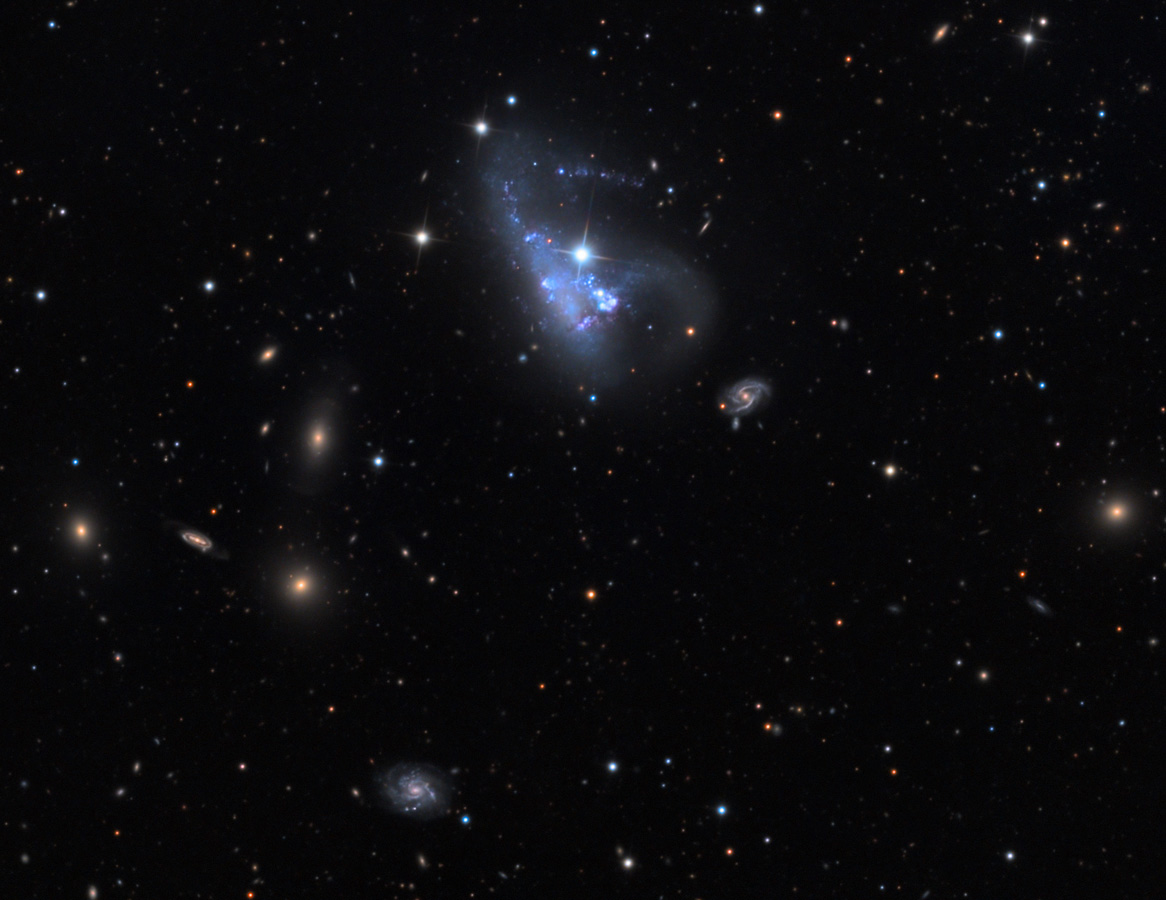
- Image of NGC 3239 (top center) as taken by the Mount Lemmon Sky Center, the bright spot inside the irregular galaxy is SN 2012A

Observation data (J2000 epoch)
- Constellation: Leo
- Right ascension: 10^{h} 25^{m} 06.24^{s}
- Declination: +17° 09′ 37.8″
- Distance: 86 Mly (26.4 Mpc)h^{−1}_{0.73}
- Apparent magnitude (B): 13.5

Characteristics
- Type: IB(s)mpec

Other designations
- Arp 263, UGC 5637, MCG +03-27-025, PGC 30560

NGC 3239 is an irregular galaxy in the constellation of Leo. The galaxy was discovered in 1784 by William Herschel and is part of the New General Catalogue. It harbors a large and relatively bright H II region in its southeastern section that was first cataloged by Russian astronomer Boris Vorontsov-Velyaminov as VV95b. It's believed that NGC 3239 is the result of a galactic merger with a low-mass galaxy.

NGC 3239 is located in the low density environment near the Lynx-Cancer Void, along with many other galaxies such as NGC 2543, NGC 3041, NGC 3344, NGC 3198, NGC 3319 and NGC 3365. Galaxies within the Lynx-Cancer Void are NGC 2500, NGC 2537, NGC 2541, NGC 2552, NGC 2337 and IC 2450.

== Supernova ==
One supernova has been observed in NGC 3239. SN 2012A (Type II-P, mag. 14.6) was discovered by Bob Moore, Jack Newton, and Tim Puckett on 7 January 2012. It reached a peak visual magnitude of +13.6. Later analysis concluded that the progenitor was a red supergiant with 10 to 15 times the mass of the sun.
