= NGC 3319 =

Galaxy in the constellation Ursa Major

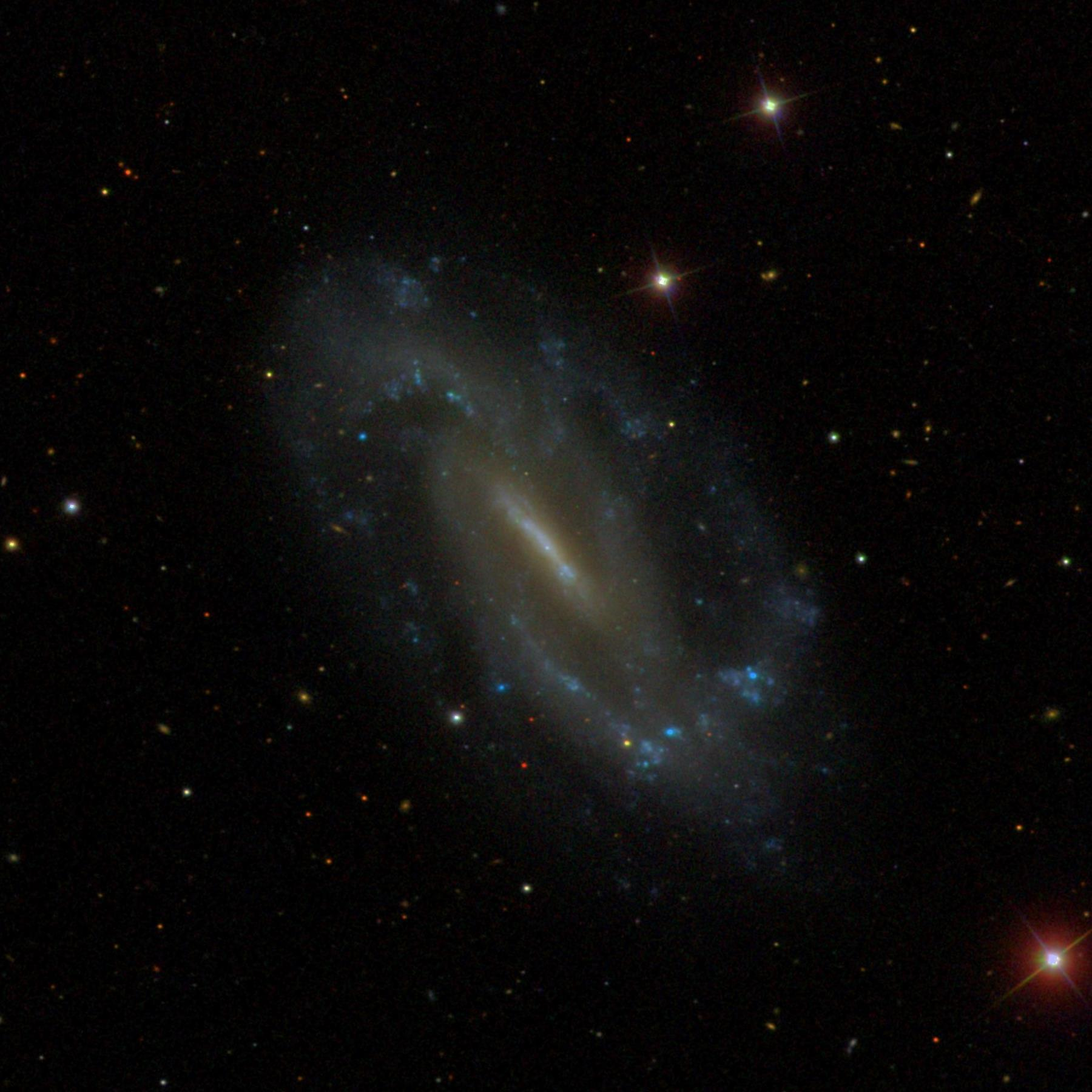
- SDSS image of NGC 3319

Observation data (J2000 epoch)
- Constellation: Ursa Major
- Right ascension: 10^{h} 39^{m} 09.533^{s}
- Declination: +41° 41′ 12.74″
- Redshift: 0.002420
- Heliocentric radial velocity: 725 ± 5 km/s
- Distance: 46.6 ± 3.6 Mly (14.3 ± 1.1 Mpc)
- Apparent magnitude (V): 11.07
- Apparent magnitude (B): 11.48

Characteristics
- Type: SB(rs)cd
- Apparent size (V): 6.2′ × 3.4′

Other designations
- UGC 5789, MCG +07-22-036, PGC 31671

NGC 3319 is a barred spiral galaxy in the constellation Ursa Major. It was discovered by William Herschel on Feb 3, 1788. It is rich in gas and lacks a galactic bulge.

NGC 3319 is relatively isolated. It is in a small group of galaxies including NGC 3104, NGC 3184, and NGC 3198. The nearest galaxy to it is probably NGC 3198, 4.2 million light-years (1.3 megaparsecs) away.

NGC 3319 is a Seyfert galaxy, with an active galactic nucleus (AGN) that was identified in 2018. NGC 3319 is a candidate for hosting an intermediate-mass black hole. The probability of having the black hole having a mass less than 10^{5} M_{☉} has been placed at 84%.

NGC 3319 is located in the low density environment near the Lynx-Cancer Void, along with many other galaxies such as NGC 2543, NGC 3041, NGC 3344, NGC 3239, NGC 3198 and NGC 3365. Galaxies within the Lynx-Cancer Void are NGC 2500, NGC 2537, NGC 2541, NGC 2552, NGC 2337 and IC 2450.

== Gallery ==
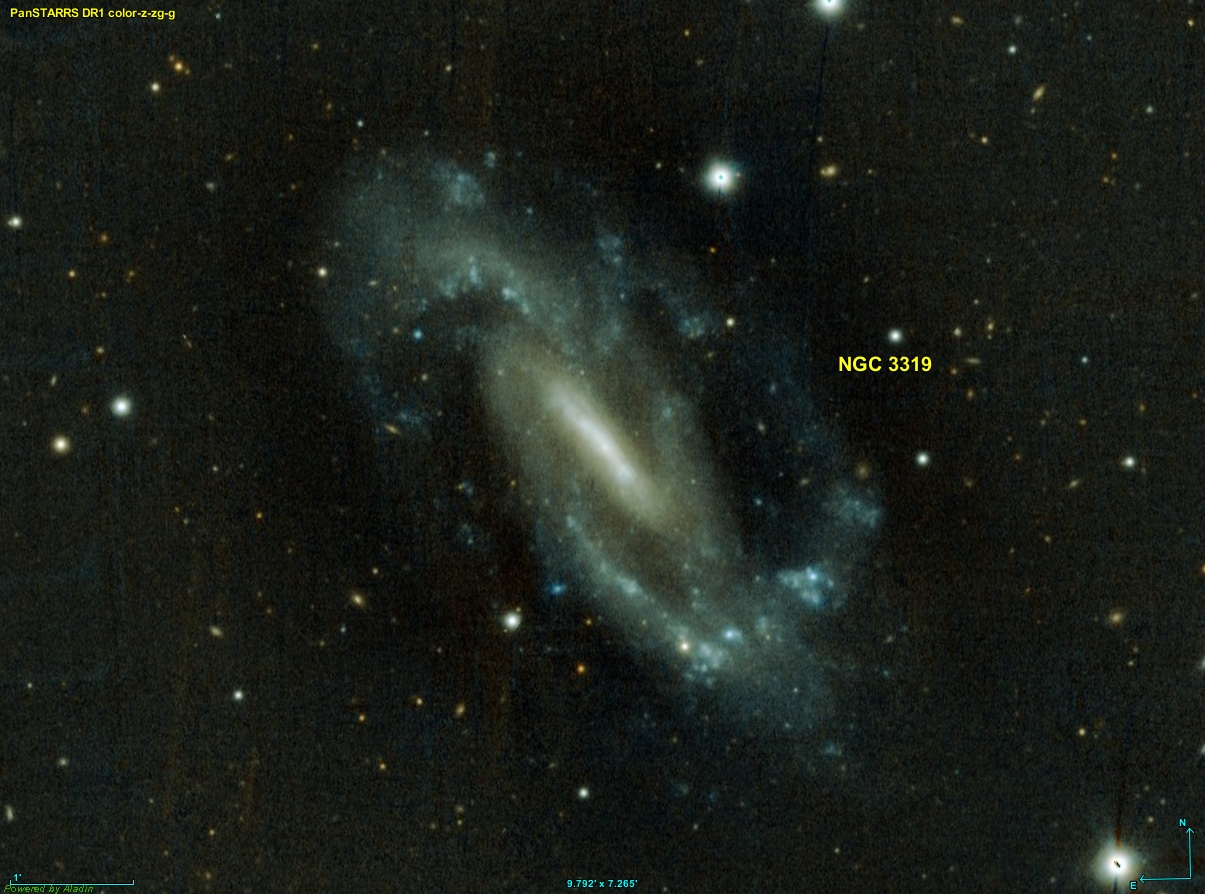
Pan-STARRS image of NGC 3319
