= NGC 2841 group =

Group of galaxies in the constellation Ursa Major

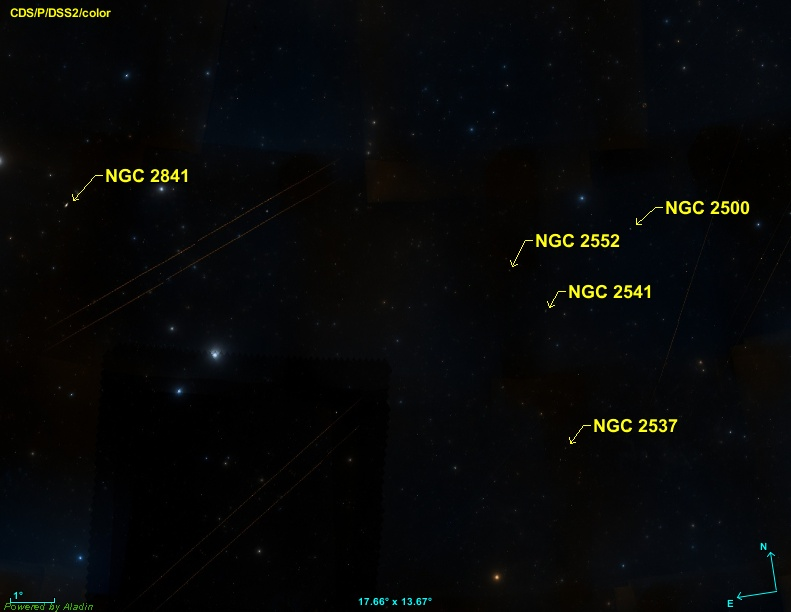

Observation data (Epoch )
- Constellation: Ursa Major / Lynx
- Distance: 19.6 million
- Notable features: NGC 2841

The NGC 2841 group is a group of galaxies about 19.6 million light-years away from Earth. It includes the loose triplet NGC 2541, NGC 2500, and NGC 2552. NGC 2841 is the fourth-brightest galaxy in Ursa Major with an apparent magnitude of 9.2. It is 20' southeast of 3 Lyncis and just below the halfway point of an imaginary line between Theta and 15 Ursae Majoris.
