= AT 2017be =

Supernova

AT2017be
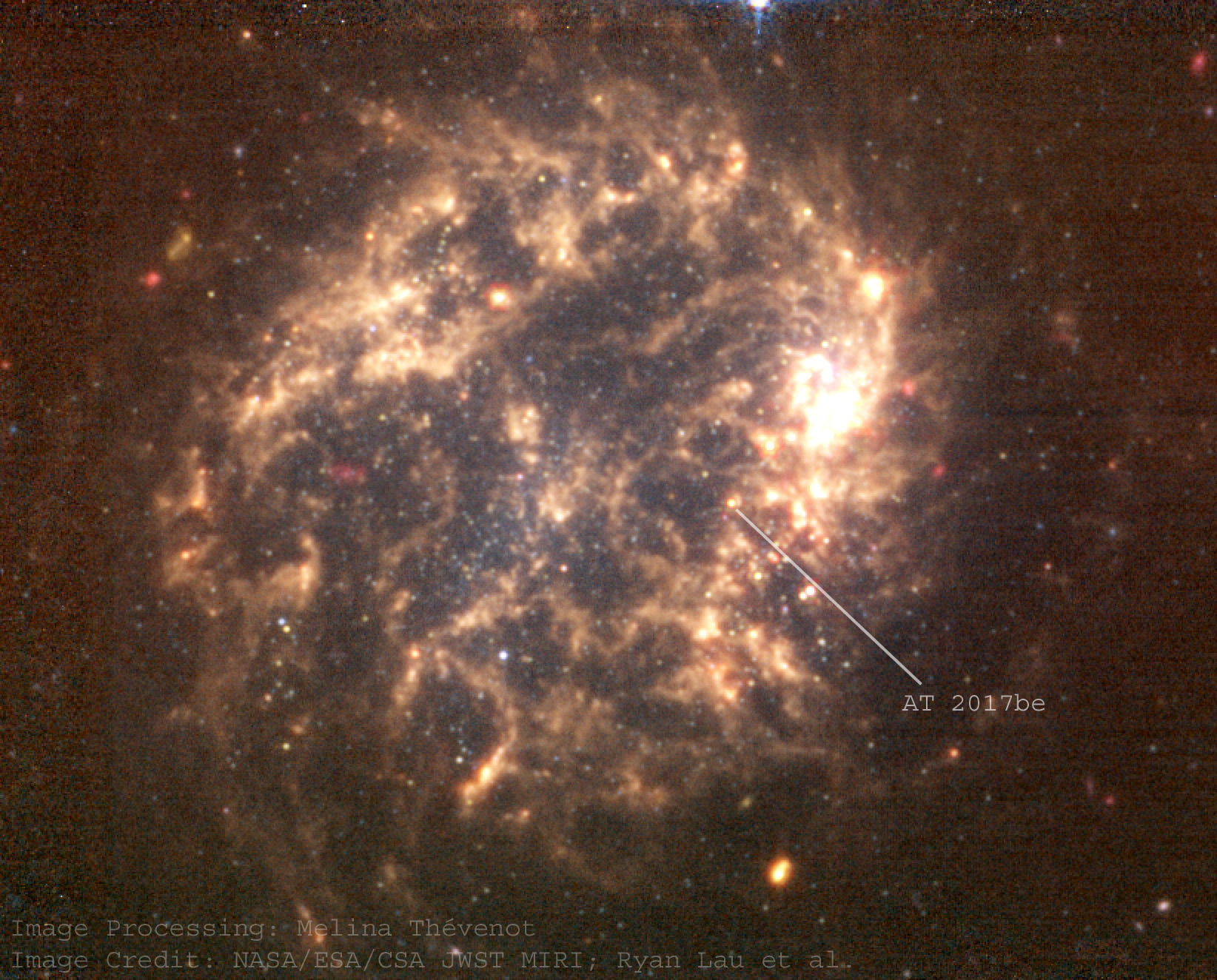
- NGC 2536 during AT 2017be imaged by James Webb
- Weak electron capture
- Constellation: Lynx
- Distance: 19.8 million ly
- Redshift: 0.001438
- Host: NGC 2537
- Progenitor type: super-asymptotic giant star
- Total energy output: 2×10^{40} ergs

AT 2017be was a weak electron capture type supernova explosion that occurred in blue compact dwarf galaxy NGC 2537, also known as the Bear claw galaxy, around 19.8 million light years from Earth. The exact time of the explosion is not known, but it probably occurred within an eight-day time interval centered on January 2, 2017. It produced around 2×10^{40} ergs of energy and ejected around 8×10^{4} M_{☉} (solar masses) of the isotope element Nickle-56. The progenitor star for this supernova was a super-asymptotic giant branch star that was embedded in a thick and dusty envelope.

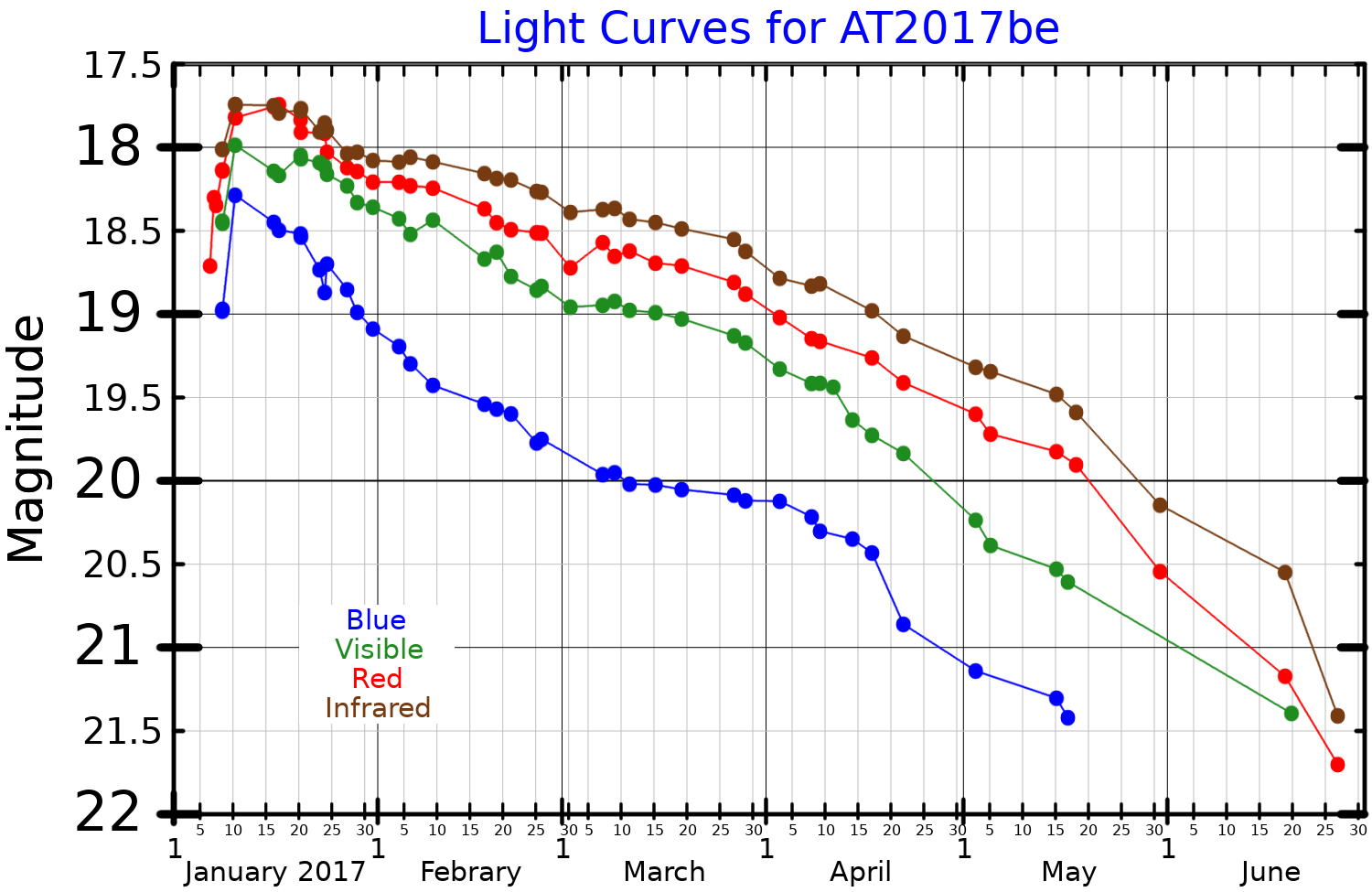
Light curves for AT2017be in four photometric bands, plotted from data published by Cai et al. (2018)

During observation, it showed minor changes over time with the blue continuum slowly getting redder with time which makes it similar to the supernova SN 2008S.
