= Extraplanar gas =

Extraplanar gas is cold atomic hydrogen which has been discovered slowly rotating around some spiral galaxies and located well outside their thin disk regions. It was discovered by using radio telescopes to observe the distribution of atomic hydrogen around galaxy disks. Galaxies which have shown evidence of extraplanar gas include NGC 891, NGC 2403, UGC 7321, NGC 4559 and NGC 3198.

Possible explanations for the presence of this gas include ionised gas being swept up by stellar winds and supernova explosions and, upon cooling, falling back into the galactic plane and the accretion of intergalactic primordial gas.
