= 23 Ursae Majoris =

Star in the constellation Ursa Major

- Location of 23 Ursae Majoris (circled)

Observation data Epoch J2000 Equinox ICRS
- Constellation: Ursa Major
- 23 UMa A
- Right ascension: 09^{h} 31^{m} 31.70873^{s}
- Declination: +63° 03′ 42.7013″
- Apparent magnitude (V): +3.65
- 23 UMa B
- Right ascension: 09^{h} 31^{m} 28.36401^{s}
- Declination: +63° 03′ 41.8990″
- Apparent magnitude (V): +9.19

Characteristics

23 UMa A
- Evolutionary stage: main sequence
- Spectral type: F0IV
- B−V color index: 0.360±0.015

23 UMa B
- Evolutionary stage: main sequence
- Spectral type: K5V

Astrometry

23 UMa A
Radial velocity (R_{v})	−10.4±0.7 km/s
Proper motion (μ)	RA: +107.99 mas/yr Dec.: +27.15 mas/yr
Parallax (π)	41.99±0.16 mas
Distance	77.7 ± 0.3 ly (23.82 ± 0.09 pc)
Absolute magnitude (M_{V})	+1.77

23 UMa B
Radial velocity (R_{v})	−2.55±0.13 km/s
Proper motion (μ)	RA: +108.861 mas/yr Dec.: +13.972 mas/yr
Parallax (π)	42.2161±0.0166 mas
Distance	77.26 ± 0.03 ly (23.688 ± 0.009 pc)

Details

23 UMa A
Mass	1.44 M_{☉}
Radius	2.84 R_{☉}
Luminosity	15.1 L_{☉}
Surface gravity (log g)	3.69 cgs
Temperature	6,748 K
Metallicity [Fe/H]	0.17 dex
Rotational velocity (v sin i)	154 km/s
Age	1.3 Gyr

23 UMa B
Mass	0.69 M_{☉}
Radius	0.68 R_{☉}
Luminosity	0.16 L_{☉}
Surface gravity (log g)	4.61 cgs
Temperature	4,436 K
Metallicity [Fe/H]	0.06 dex

Other designations
- h UMa, 23 UMa, BD+63°845, FK5 355, GJ 3534, HD 81937, HIP 46733, HR 3757, SAO 14908, CCDM J09315+6303A/B

Database references
SIMBAD	data

23 Ursae Majoris, or 23 UMa, is a binary star system in the constellation Ursa Major, located is approximately 77.7 light years from the Sun. It has the Bayer designation h Ursae Majoris; 23 Ursae Majoris is the Flamsteed designation. The system is visible to the naked eye as a yellow-white hued star with an apparent visual magnitude of +3.65. It is moving closer to the Earth with a heliocentric radial velocity of −10 km/s.

The primary component is a yellow-white F-type subgiant with an apparent magnitude of +3.65. It has 1.9 times the Sun's mass, 2.9 times the Sun's radius and is emitting 15 times the luminosity of the Sun at an effective temperature of 6,651 K. Orbiting at an angular separation of 22.7 arcseconds is the 9th magnitude secondary companion. There is a magnitude +10.5 optical companion at an angular separation of 99.6 arcseconds.

== Nomenclature ==
With τ, υ, φ, θ, e and f, it composed the Arabic asterism Sarīr Banāt al-Na'sh, the Throne of the daughters of Na'sh, and Al-Haud, the Pond. According to the catalogue of stars in the Technical Memorandum 33-507 - A Reduced Star Catalog Containing 537 Named Stars, Al-Haud was the title for seven stars : f as Alhaud I, τ as Alhaud II, e as Alhaud III, this star (h) as Alhaud IV, θ as Alhaud V, υ as Alhaud VI and φ as Alhaud VII .
