= Tau Ursae Majoris =

Binary star in the constellation Ursa Major

- Location of τ Ursae Majoris (circled in red)

Observation data Epoch J2000.0 Equinox J2000.0 (ICRS)
- Constellation: Ursa Major
- Right ascension: 09^{h} 10^{m} 55.06553^{s}
- Declination: +63° 30′ 49.0553″
- Apparent magnitude (V): 4.66

Characteristics
- Spectral type: kA5hF0mF5 II
- U−B color index: +0.14
- B−V color index: +0.35

Astrometry
Radial velocity (R_{v})	−9.80±0.30 km/s
Proper motion (μ)	RA: +102.37 mas/yr Dec.: −63.55 mas/yr
Parallax (π)	25.82±0.54 mas
Distance	126 ± 3 ly (38.7 ± 0.8 pc)
Absolute magnitude (M_{V})	+1.73

Orbit
Period (P)	1,062.4 d
Eccentricity (e)	0.48
Periastron epoch (T)	2425721.6 JD
Argument of periastron (ω) (secondary)	349.4°
Semi-amplitude (K_{1}) (primary)	3.9 km/s

Details

τ UMa A
Mass	1.8±0.1 M_{☉}
Luminosity	16 L_{☉}
Surface gravity (log g)	3.86±0.43 cgs
Temperature	7,343±100 K
Metallicity [Fe/H]	+0.57±0.15 dex
Rotational velocity (v sin i)	21 km/s

Other designations
- τ UMa, 14 Ursae Majoris, BD+64°723, FK5 2727, HD 78362, HIP 45075, HR 3624, SAO 14796, WDS J09109+6331A

Database references
SIMBAD	data

Tau Ursae Majoris (τ UMa) is the Bayer designation for a binary star in the northern circumpolar constellation of Ursa Major. It is visible to the naked eye, having an apparent visual magnitude of 4.66. With an annual parallax shift of 25.82 mas, it is located about 126 light years from the Sun. At that distance, the visual magnitude is diminished by an extinction factor of 0.19 due to interstellar dust.

This is a single-lined spectroscopic binary star system with an orbital period of 2.9 years and an eccentricity of 0.48. The primary member, component A, is an evolved bright giant with a stellar classification of kA5hF0mF5 II. This notation indicates the star's spectrum shows the calcium K lines of an A5 star, the hydrogen lines of an F0 star, and the metallic lines of an F5 star. It is an evolved Am star of the ρ Puppis type, a class of evolved stars showing the Am chemical peculiarities. It is located in the instability strip of the Hertzsprung–Russell diagram but is not thought to be variable.

== Naming ==
With φ, h, υ, θ, e, and f, it composed the Arabic asterism Sarīr Banāt al-Na'sh, the Throne of the daughters of Na'sh, and Al-Haud, the Pond. According to the catalogue of stars in the Technical Memorandum 33-507 - A Reduced Star Catalog Containing 537 Named Stars, Al-Haud were the title for seven stars : f as Alhaud I, this star (τ) as Alhaud II, e as Alhaud III, h as Alhaud IV, θ as Alhaud V, υ as Alhaud VI and φ as Alhaud VII .
