= 18 Ursae Majoris =

Star in the constellation Ursa Major

- Location of 18 Ursae Majoris (circled in red)

Observation data Epoch J2000.0 Equinox ICRS
- Constellation: Ursa Major
- Right ascension: 09^{h} 16^{m} 11.32784^{s}
- Declination: +54° 01′ 18.6878″
- Apparent magnitude (V): 4.832

Characteristics
- Evolutionary stage: main sequence
- Spectral type: A6 V
- U−B color index: 0.087
- B−V color index: 0.186
- Variable type: δ Sct

Astrometry
| Radial velocity (R_{v}) | −16.13±1.30 km/s |
| Proper motion (μ) | RA: +49.43 mas/yr Dec.: +59.92 mas/yr |
| Parallax (π) | 27.90±0.20 mas |
| Distance | 116.9 ± 0.8 ly (35.8 ± 0.3 pc) |
| Absolute magnitude (M_{V}) | 2.03 |

Details
| Mass | 1.72±0.02 M_{☉} |
| Luminosity | 12.83 L_{☉} |
| Surface gravity (log g) | 3.98±0.2 cgs |
| Temperature | 7,450±150 K |
| Rotational velocity (v sin i) | 158±17 km/s |
| Age | 1.05+0.10 −0.15 Gyr |

Other designations
- e UMa, 18 UMa, DD UMa, BD+54°1285, FK5 2734, GJ 3541, HD 79439, HIP 45493, HR 3662, SAO 27191

Database references
| SIMBAD | data |

18 Ursae Majoris, or e Ursae Majoris, is a single star in the northern circumpolar constellation of Ursa Major. It is faintly visible to the naked eye with an apparent visual magnitude of 4.832. The annual parallax shift measured from Earth's orbit is 27.90 mas, which provides a distance estimate of 117 light years. It is moving closer to the Sun with a heliocentric radial velocity of −16 km/s, and is an unbound and older member of the Ursa Major Moving Group.

The stellar classification assigned to this star is A6 V, which indicates it is an A-type main-sequence star that is generating energy through hydrogen fusion at its core. The star's variability was first noticed by American astronomer Frank Schlesinger in 1914, and the variable star designation DD UMa was given to it. This is a low amplitude Delta Scuti variable with a magnitude change of around 0.4 and pulsation cycles of 9.4 and 15.0 cycles per day. It is rotating rapidly with a projected rotational velocity of about 158 km/s. This is giving the star an oblate shape with an equatorial bulge that is an estimated 6% larger than the polar radius.

18 UMa is about a billion years old with 1.72 times the mass of the Sun. It is radiating around 13 times the Sun's luminosity from its photosphere at an effective temperature of about 7,450 K.

== Naming ==
With τ, h, υ, φ, θ and f, it composed the Arabic asterism Sarīr Banāt al-Na'sh, the Throne of the daughters of Na'sh, and Al-Haud, the Pond. According to the catalogue of stars in the Technical Memorandum 33-507 - A Reduced Star Catalog Containing 537 Named Stars, Al-Haud were the title for seven stars: f as Alhaud I, τ as Alhaud II, this star (e) as Alhaud III, h as Alhaud IV, θ as Alhaud V, υ as Alhaud VI and φ as Alhaud VII.
