= IC 2233 =

Spiral galaxy in the constellation of Lynx

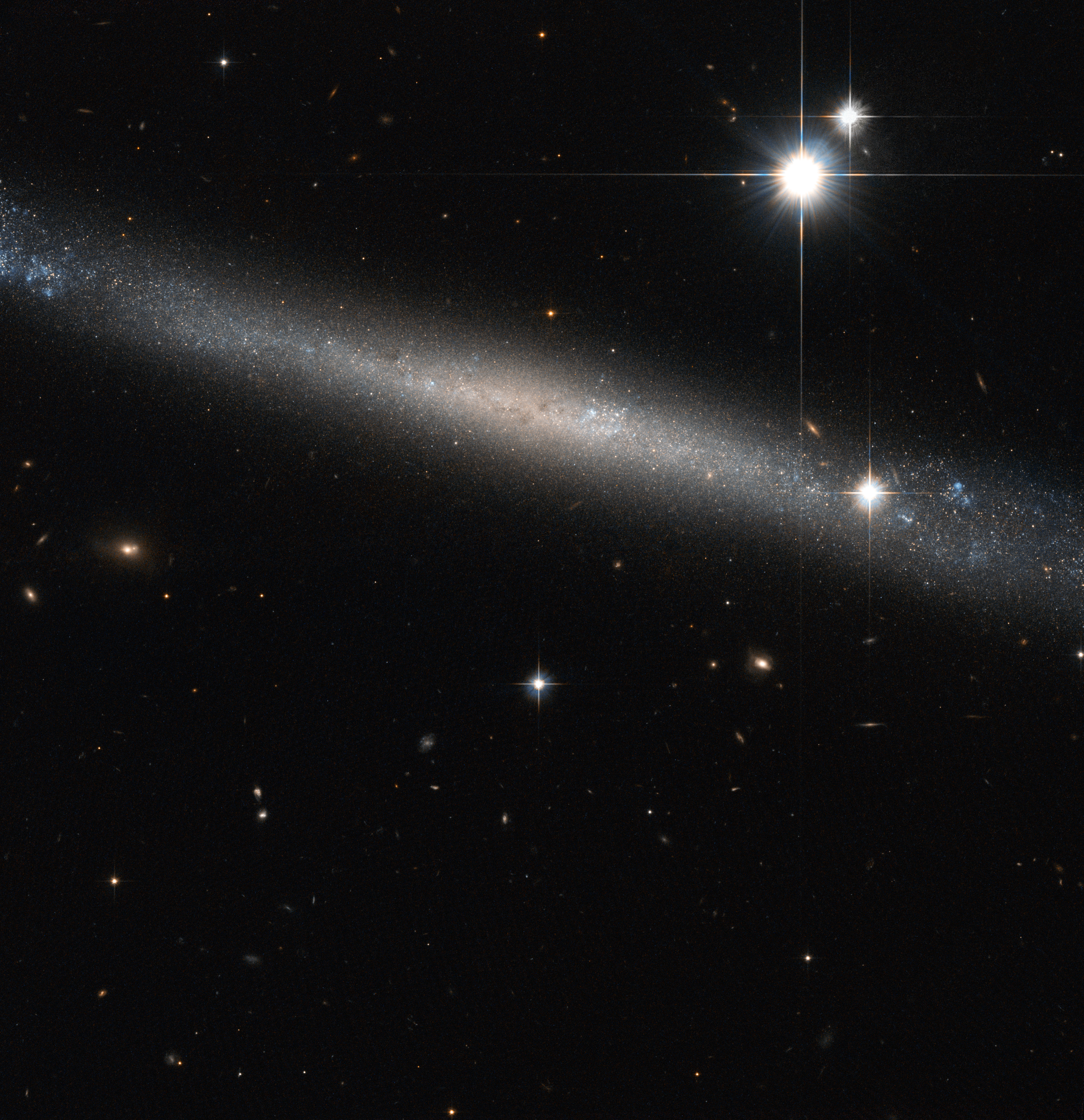
- The spiral galaxy IC 2233 is one of the flattest galaxies known.

Observation data (J2000 epoch)
- Constellation: Lynx
- Right ascension: 08^{h} 13^{m} 58.77^{s}
- Declination: +45° 44′ 41.9″
- Redshift: 0.001868
- Heliocentric radial velocity: 559 km/s
- Distance: 40 million light-years
- Apparent magnitude (V): 12.63

Characteristics
- Type: Sd D

Other designations
- 2MASX J08135890+4544317, SDSS J081358.76+454441.8, Z 236-36, FGC 730, 2MASXI J0813589+454434, SHOC 192, Z 0810.4+4554, IRAS F08104+4553, MCG+08-15-052, TC 702, [M98c] 081027.6+455350, LCSB L334, 2MFGC 6519, UGC 4278, LEDA 23071, RFGC 1340, UZC J081358.9+454434

IC 2233, also known as UGC 4278, is a spiral galaxy lying in the constellation of Lynx. IC 2233 is located between 26 and 40 million light-years away from Earth. A comparatively quiet galaxy with a low rate of star formation (less than one solar mass every twenty years), it was long thought to be possibly interacting with the Bear's Paw galaxy. However, this is now considered highly unlikely as radio observations with the Very Large Array showed the two galaxies lie at different distances. This galaxy was discovered by British astronomer Isaac Roberts in 1894.

== Gallery ==
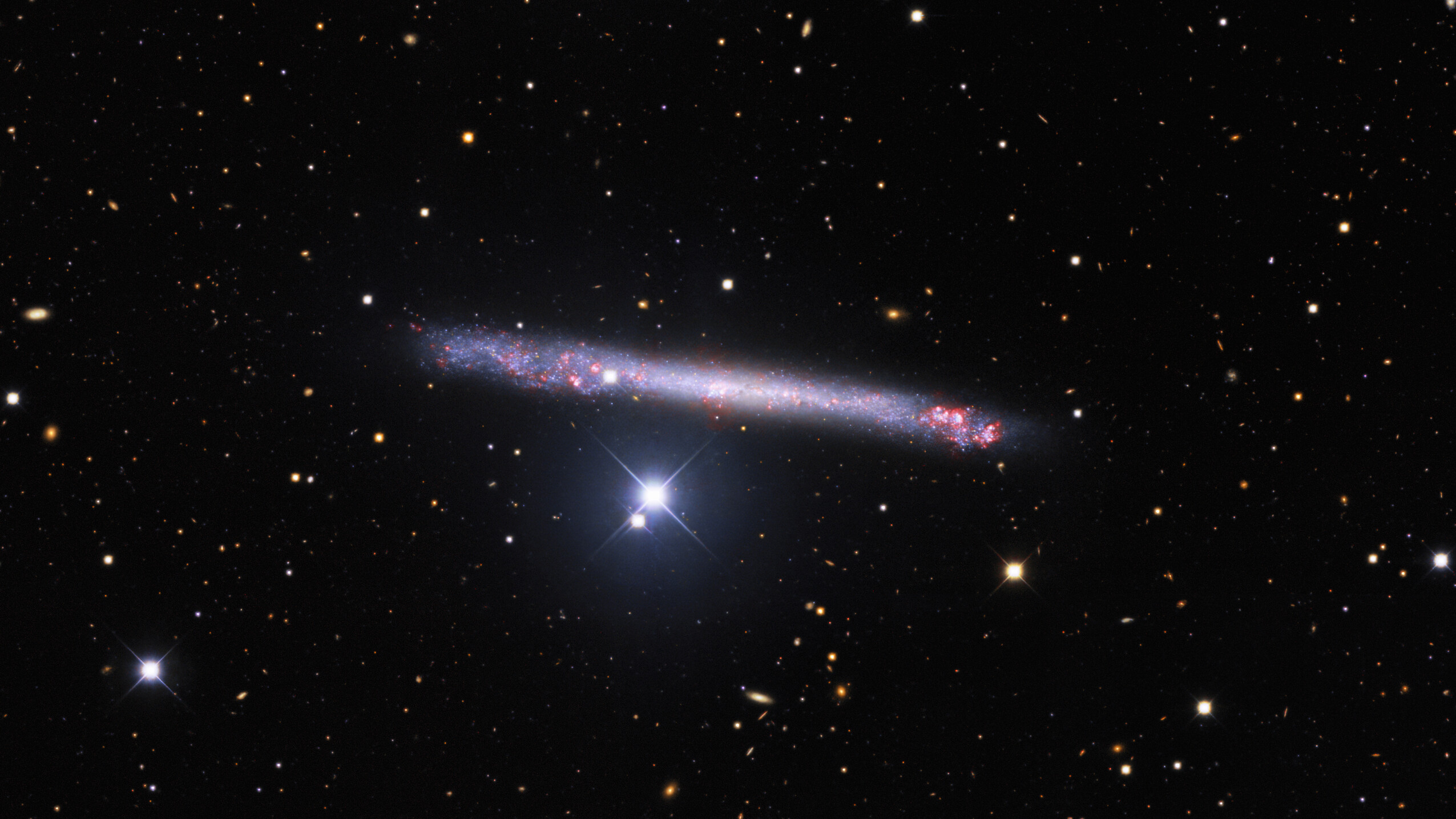
The remarkably thin galaxy IC 2233 is featured in this image from the Nicholas U. Mayall 4-meter Telescope at Kitt Peak National Observatory, a Program of NSF’s NOIRLab.
