= Upsilon Ursae Majoris =

Binary star in the constellation Ursa Major

- Location of υ Ursae Majoris (circled)

Observation data Epoch J2000.0 Equinox J2000.0 (ICRS)
- Constellation: Ursa Major
- Right ascension: 09^{h} 50^{m} 59.35700^{s}
- Declination: +59° 02′ 19.4486″
- Apparent magnitude (V): 3.68 – 3.86

Characteristics
- Spectral type: F2 IV
- U−B color index: +0.09
- B−V color index: +0.29
- Variable type: δ Sct

Astrometry
Radial velocity (R_{v})	27.3±4.1 km/s
Proper motion (μ)	RA: +42.97 mas/yr Dec.: −23.62 mas/yr
Parallax (π)	28.06±0.20 mas
Distance	116.2 ± 0.8 ly (35.6 ± 0.3 pc)
Absolute magnitude (M_{V})	+1.11

Details

υ UMa A
Mass	1.57 or 2.20 M_{☉}
Radius	2.79±0.40 R_{☉}
Luminosity	29.5 L_{☉}
Surface gravity (log g)	3.79±0.14 cgs
Temperature	7,211±245 K
Rotation	1.2±0.30 d
Rotational velocity (v sin i)	124.2 km/s
Age	1.168 Gyr

υ UMa B
Mass	0.44 M_{☉}

Other designations
- υ UMa, WDS J09510+5902
- A: 29 Ursae Majoris, BD+59°1268, FK5 368, HD 84999, HIP 48319, HR 3888, SAO 27401

Database references
SIMBAD	data

Upsilon Ursae Majoris, Latinized from υ Ursae Majoris, is a binary star in the northern circumpolar constellation of Ursa Major. It is visible to the naked eye with an apparent visual magnitude of +3.79. Based upon an annual parallax shift of 13.24 mas, it is located roughly 246 light-years from the Sun.

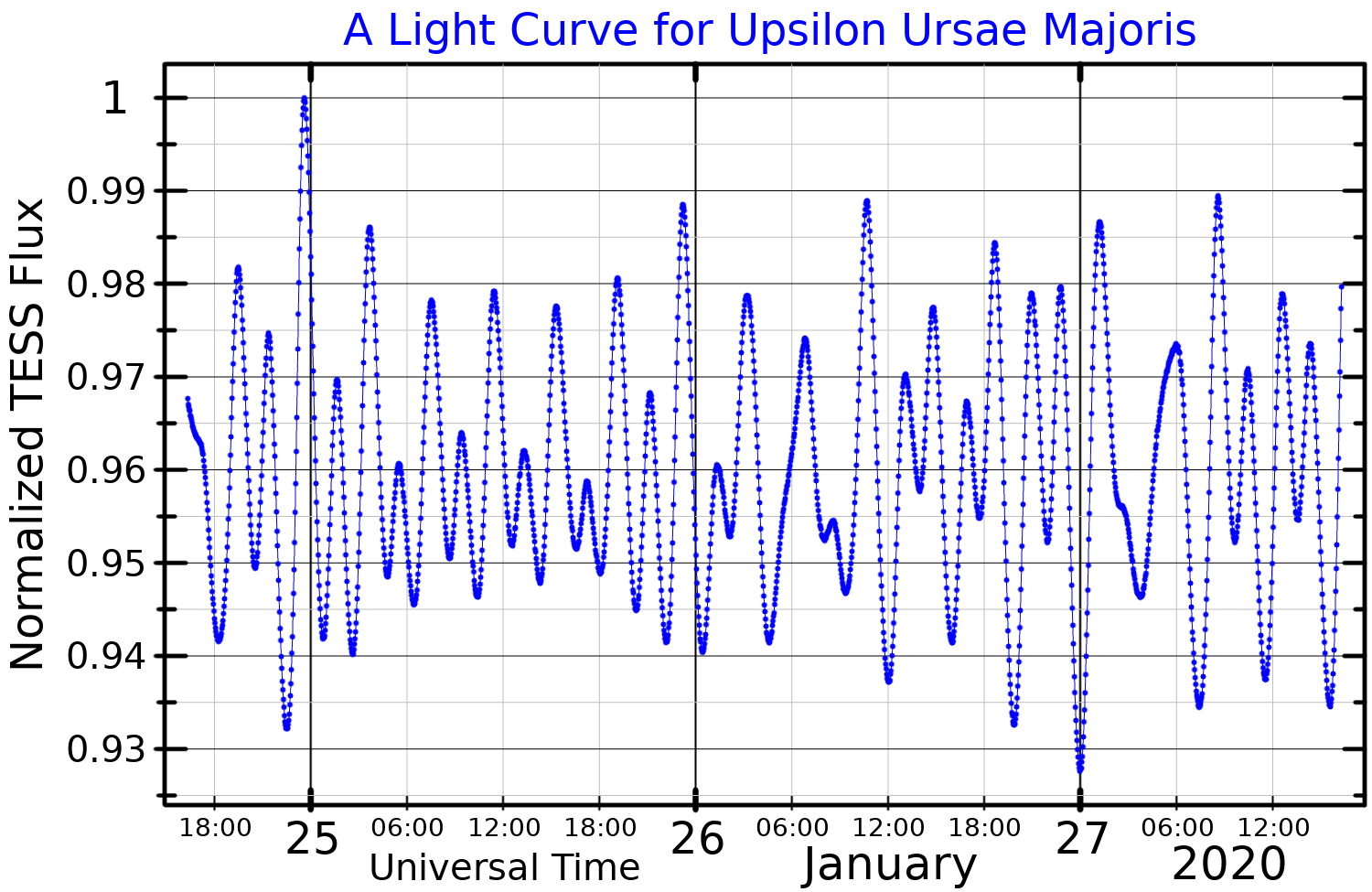
A light curve for Upsilon Ursae Majoris, plotted from TESS data

The primary member of the system, component A, is an F-type subgiant star. It is a Delta Scuti variable with a period of 0.1327 day and an amplitude of 0.050 magnitude. With an estimated age of 1.168 billion years, it is spinning rapidly with a projected rotational velocity of 124.2 km/s and a rotation period of 1.2 days. The star has about 1.57 times the mass of the Sun and 2.79 times the Sun's radius. (De Rosa and colleagues give a mass estimate of 2.2 times the Sun's mass.) It is radiating around 29.5 times the solar luminosity from its outer atmosphere at an effective temperature of 7,211 K.

The companion, component B, is a magnitude +11.0 star. As of 2008, it has an angular separation of 11.78 arcseconds along a position angle of 295.4°. This corresponds to a projected separation of 419.8 AU. It has a mass around 40% that of the Sun.

== Naming ==
With τ, h, φ, θ, e and f, it composed the Arabic asterism Sarīr Banāt al-Na'sh, the Throne of the daughters of Na'sh, and Al-Haud, the Pond. According to the catalogue of stars in the Technical Memorandum 33-507 - A Reduced Star Catalog Containing 537 Named Stars, Al-Haud were the title for seven stars : f as Alhaud I, τ as Alhaud II, e as Alhaud III, h as Alhaud IV, θ as Alhaud V, this star (υ) as Alhaud VI and φ as Alhaud VII .

In Chinese, 文昌 (Wén Chāng), meaning Administrative Center, refers to an asterism consisting of υ Ursae Majoris, φ Ursae Majoris, θ Ursae Majoris, 15 Ursae Majoris and 18 Ursae Majoris. Consequently, the Chinese name for υ Ursae Majoris itself is 文昌一 (Wén Chāng yī, English: the first Star of Administrative Center.).
