= Phi Ursae Majoris =

Binary star in the constellation Ursa Major

- Location of φ Ursae Majoris (circled)

Observation data Epoch J2000.0 Equinox ICRS
- Constellation: Ursa Major
- Right ascension: 09^{h} 52^{m} 06.35437^{s}
- Declination: +54° 03′ 51.5962″
- Apparent magnitude (V): +4.60 (5.28 + 5.39)

Characteristics
- Spectral type: A3 IV + A3 IV
- U−B color index: +0.08
- B−V color index: +0.03

Astrometry
Radial velocity (R_{v})	−14.7±0.3 km/s
Proper motion (μ)	RA: −6.00 mas/yr Dec.: +19.16 mas/yr
Parallax (π)	6.41±0.59 mas
Distance	510 ± 50 ly (160 ± 10 pc)
Absolute magnitude (M_{V})	−1.39

Orbit
Period (P)	104.6 yr
Semi-major axis (a)	0.329″
Eccentricity (e)	0.436
Inclination (i)	19.4°
Longitude of the node (Ω)	132.5°
Periastron epoch (T)	1987.52
Argument of periastron (ω) (secondary)	33.3°

Details

A
Mass	3.5±0.2 M_{☉}
Luminosity	347 L_{☉}
Surface gravity (log g)	3.69±0.16 cgs
Temperature	8,769±150 K
Metallicity [Fe/H]	−0.23±0.08 dex
Rotational velocity (v sin i)	28 km/s

Other designations
- φ UMi, 30 Ursae Majoris, BD+54°1331, GC 13559, HD 85235, HIP 48402, HR 3894, SAO 27408, PPM 32355, CCDM J09521+5404AB, WDS J09521+5404AB

Database references
SIMBAD	data

Phi Ursae Majoris, Latinized from φ Ursae Majoris, is a binary star system in the northern constellation of Ursa Major. It is white-hued and is visible to the naked eye with a combined apparent visual magnitude of +4.60; the primary is magnitude 5.28 while the secondary is magnitude 5.39. The system is located at a distance of approximately 510 light-years (160 parsecs) from the Sun based on parallax, but is drifting closer with a radial velocity of −14.7 km/s. It should make its closest approach at a distance of around 370 light-years in about 4.7 million years.

As of 2017, the components had an angular separation of 0.50″ along a position angle of 304°. They are orbiting each other with a period of 105.4 years and eccentricity of 0.44. Both of components are A-type subgiant stars with a stellar classification of A3 IV.

Phi Ursae Majoris is moving through the galaxy at a speed of 21.6 km/s relative to the Sun. Its projected galactic orbit carries it between 24,000 and 46,000 light-years from the center of the galaxy.

== Naming ==
With τ, h, υ, θ, e, and f, it composed the Arabic asterism Sarīr Banāt al-Na'sh, the Throne of the daughters of Na'sh, and Al-Haud, the Pond. According to the catalogue of stars in the Technical Memorandum 33-507 - A Reduced Star Catalog Containing 537 Named Stars, Al-Haud were the title for seven stars: f as Alhaud I, τ as Alhaud II, e as Alhaud III, h as Alhaud IV, θ as Alhaud V, υ as Alhaud VI and this star (φ) as Alhaud VII.

In Chinese, 文昌 (Wén Chāng), meaning Administrative Center, refers to an asterism consisting of φ Ursae Majoris, υ Ursae Majoris, θ Ursae Majoris, 15 Ursae Majoris and 18 Ursae Majoris. Consequently, the Chinese name for φ Ursae Majoris itself is known as 文昌三 (Wén Chāng sān, English: the Third Star of Administrative Center).
