= NGC 2535 =

Unbarred spiral galaxy in the constellation Cancer

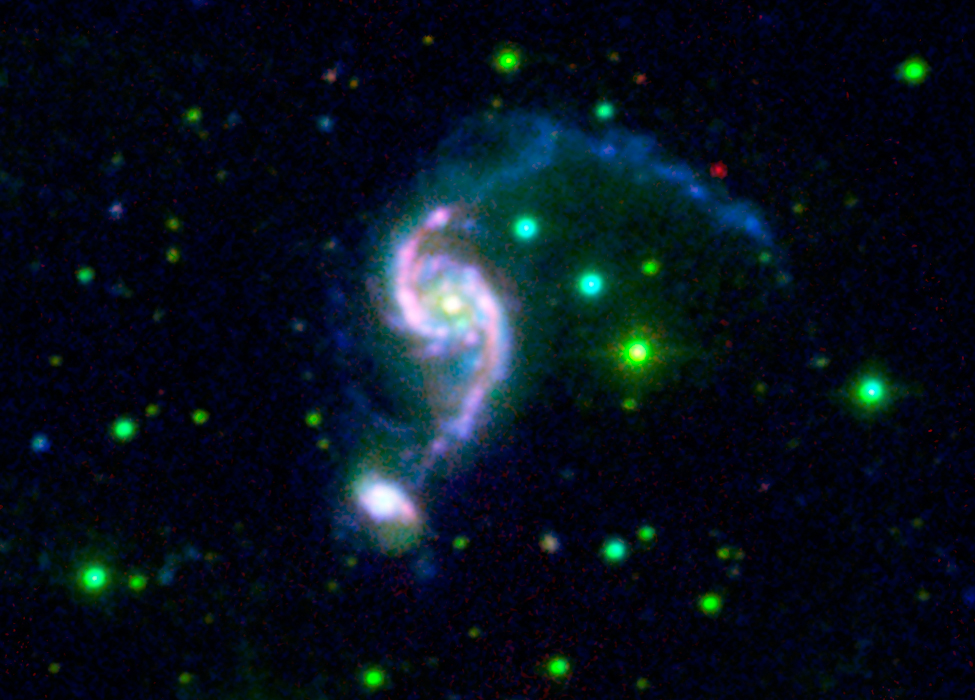
- A multiwavelength image of NGC 2535 (top) and NGC 2536. Mid-infrared emission is red, H alpha emission (at 694 nm) is green, and ultraviolet emission is blue.

Observation data (J2000 epoch)
- Constellation: Cancer
- Right ascension: 8^{h} 11^{m} 13.4880^{s}
- Declination: +25° 12′ 24.739″
- Redshift: 4097 ± 9 km/s
- Apparent magnitude (V): 16.9

Characteristics
- Type: SA(r)c pec
- Apparent size (V): 2.5′ × 1.2′

Other designations
- Arp 82, UGC 4264, MCG +04-20-004, PGC 22957, CGCG 119-008

NGC 2535 is an unbarred spiral galaxy in the constellation Cancer. Its velocity with respect to the cosmic microwave background is 4,313±15 km/s, which corresponds to a Hubble distance of 207.5 ± 14.5 Mly (63.61 ± 4.46 Mpc). However, nine non-redshift measurements give a much closer mean distance of 88.46 ± 19.31 Mly (27.121 ± 5.922 Mpc). It was discovered on 22 January 1877 by French astronomer Édouard Stephan.

NGC 2535 is exhibiting a weak inner ring structure around the nucleus that is interacting with NGC 2536. The interaction has warped the disk and spiral arms of NGC 2535, producing an elongated structure, visible at ultraviolet wavelengths, that contain many bright, recently formed blue star clusters in addition to enhanced star forming regions around the galaxy center. The two galaxies are listed together as Arp 82 in the Atlas of Peculiar Galaxies as an example of a spiral galaxy with a high surface brightness companion.

== Supernova ==
One supernova has been observed in NGC 2535. SN 1901A (type unknown, mag. 14.7) was seen by Karl Reinmuth on a photographic plate taken on 10 January 1901, although the discovery was not made until 28 September 1923.

== See also ==
- NGC 2536
- List of NGC objects (2001–3000)
