= Theta Ursae Majoris =

Star system in the constellation Ursa Major

- Location of θ Ursae Majoris (circled)

Observation data Epoch J2000 Equinox ICRS
- Constellation: Ursa Major
- Right ascension: 09^{h} 32^{m} 51.43390^{s}
- Declination: +51° 40′ 38.2811″
- Apparent magnitude (V): 3.166

Characteristics
- Spectral type: F6 IV
- U−B color index: +0.03
- B−V color index: +0.46
- Variable type: Suspected

Astrometry
Radial velocity (R_{v})	+14.6 km/s
Proper motion (μ)	RA: -947.46 mas/yr Dec.: -535.60 mas/yr
Parallax (π)	74.19±0.14 mas
Distance	43.96 ± 0.08 ly (13.48 ± 0.03 pc)
Absolute magnitude (M_{V})	2.43

Details
Mass	1.41 M_{☉}
Radius	2.41±0.02 R_{☉}
Luminosity	7.871±0.158 L_{☉}
Surface gravity (log g)	3.80 cgs
Temperature	6,256±82 K
Metallicity [Fe/H]	–0.18 dex
Rotational velocity (v sin i)	6.8 km/s
Age	2.2 Gyr

Other designations
- θ UMa, 25 UMa, BD+52 1401, FK5 358, GC 13157, GJ 354, HD 82328, HIP 46853, HR 3775, SAO 27289, PPM 32203, CCDM J09329+5141A, WDS J09329+5141A, IDS 09262+5208 A

Database references
SIMBAD	data

Theta Ursae Majoris (Theta UMa, θ Ursae Majoris, θ UMa) is a suspected spectroscopic binary star system in the northern circumpolar constellation of Ursa Major. It has an apparent visual magnitude of 3.17, placing it among the brighter members of this constellation. The distance to this star has been measured directly using the parallax method, yielding an estimated value of 43.96 light-years (13.48 parsecs).

In 1976, this was reported as a spectroscopic binary system by Helmut A. Abt and Saul G. Levy, giving it an orbital period of 371 days. However, this was brought into question by Christopher L. Morbey and Roger F. Griffin in 1987, who suggested that the data could be explained by random chance. Further observations in 2009 with observations with the Bok Telescope in Arizona did show changes of 180 m/s in radial velocity, although there was not sufficient evidence to support a Keplerian orbit. There is a 14th-magnitude common proper motion companion to Theta Ursae Majoris at an angular separation of 4.1 arcseconds, so this may potentially be a triple star system.

The primary component of this putative system has a published stellar classification of F6 IV, indicating it is a subgiant star that is evolving away from the main sequence. In 2009, Helmut A. Abt listed it with a stellar classification of F7 V, suggesting that it is still on the main sequence. It is larger than the Sun with 141% of the Sun's mass and 241% of the Sun's radius. Consequently, it is shining brighter and evolving more rapidly than the Sun, with a luminosity nearly eight times the Sun's at an age of 2.2 billion years. This energy is being radiated from the star's outer atmosphere at an effective temperature of 6,256 K. At this heat, the star glows with the yellow-white hue of an F-type star.

The McDonald Observatory team has set limits to the hypothetical presence of one or more planets around the primary with masses between 0.24 and 4.6 Jupiter masses and average separations spanning between 0.05 and 5.2 AU.

== Naming and etymology ==
- With τ, h, υ, φ, e, and f, it composed the Arabic asterism Sarīr Banāt al-Na'sh, the Throne of the daughters of Na'sh, and Al-Haud, the Pond. According to the catalogue of stars in the Technical Memorandum 33-507 - A Reduced Star Catalog Containing 537 Named Stars, Al-Haud were the title for seven stars : f as Alhaud I, τ as Alhaud II, e as Alhaud III, h as Alhaud IV, this star (θ) as Alhaud V, υ as Alhaud VI and φ as Alhaud VII .
- In Chinese, 文昌 (Wén Chāng), meaning Administrative Center, refers to an asterism consisting of θ Ursae Majoris, φ Ursae Majoris, υ Ursae Majoris, 15 Ursae Majoris and 18 Ursae Majoris. Consequently, the Chinese name for φ Ursae Majoris itself is known as 文昌四 (Wén Chāng sì, English: the Fourth Star of Administrative Center.). In addition, it is also the star of Shao Siming (少司命), one of the Chinese gods of destiny.
