= 15 Ursae Majoris =

Star in the constellation Ursa Major

- Location of 15 Ursae Majoris (circled in red)

Observation data Epoch J2000.0 Equinox ICRS
- Constellation: Ursa Major
- Right ascension: 09^{h} 08^{m} 52.25763^{s}
- Declination: +51° 36′ 16.7330″
- Apparent magnitude (V): 4.46

Characteristics
- Evolutionary stage: main sequence
- Spectral type: kA3VmF5IIISr
- B−V color index: 0.288±0.013

Astrometry
Radial velocity (R_{v})	−0.1±0.7 km/s
Proper motion (μ)	RA: −136.33 mas/yr Dec.: −32.60 mas/yr
Parallax (π)	34.70±0.24 mas
Distance	94.0 ± 0.7 ly (28.8 ± 0.2 pc)
Absolute magnitude (M_{V})	2.16

Details
Mass	1.86 M_{☉}
Radius	1.3 R_{☉}
Luminosity	11.31 L_{☉}
Surface gravity (log g)	3.77±0.08 cgs
Temperature	7,519±98 K
Metallicity [Fe/H]	0.55±0.05 dex
Rotational velocity (v sin i)	42 km/s
Age	220 Myr

Other designations
- f UMa, 15 UMa, BD+52°1365, FK5 2721, GJ 3534, HD 78209, HIP 44901, HR 3619, SAO 27136

Database references
SIMBAD	data

15 Ursae Majoris is a star in the northern circumpolar constellation Ursa Major, located 94 light-years away from the Sun. It has the Bayer designation f Ursae Majoris; 15 Ursae Majoris is the Flamsteed designation. It is visible to the naked eye as a white-hued star with an apparent visual magnitude of 4.46. 15 Ursae Majoris is a suspected member of the Castor stellar kinematic group, a 200-million-year-old association of co-moving stars.

According to Eggleton and Tokovinin (2008), this is a suspected binary star system with an orbital period of 4.9 days and an eccentricity of 0.2. However, De Rosa et al. (2014) did not find a companion. The primary is metallic-lined (Am) star, meaning it has unusually strong absorption lines of metals in its spectrum. Classification of the spectrum is difficult due to the peculiarities. An MK classification of 15 UMa using the calcium K line is A3 V, but using metallic spectral lines it can appear as a cooler and more luminous star. Spectral lines in the blue region give a classification of F5 Ib, while in the violet region the lines suggest F5 III/IV.

== Nomenclature ==
With τ, h, υ Ursae Majoris, φ, θ and e it composed the Arabic asterism Sarīr Banāt al-Na'sh, the Throne of the daughters of Na'sh, and Al-Haud, the Pond. According to the catalogue of stars in the Technical Memorandum 33-507 - A Reduced Star Catalog Containing 537 Named Stars, Al-Haud were the title for seven stars: this star (f) as Alhaud I, τ as Alhaud II, e as Alhaud III, h as Alhaud IV, θ as Alhaud V, υ as Alhaud VI and φ as Alhaud VII.

In Chinese, 文昌 (Wén Chāng), meaning Administrative Center, refers to an asterism consisting six stars, such as 15 Ursae Majoris, υ Ursae Majoris, θ Ursae Majoris and φ Ursae Majoris.
