= NGC 2536 =

Barred spiral galaxy in the constellation Cancer

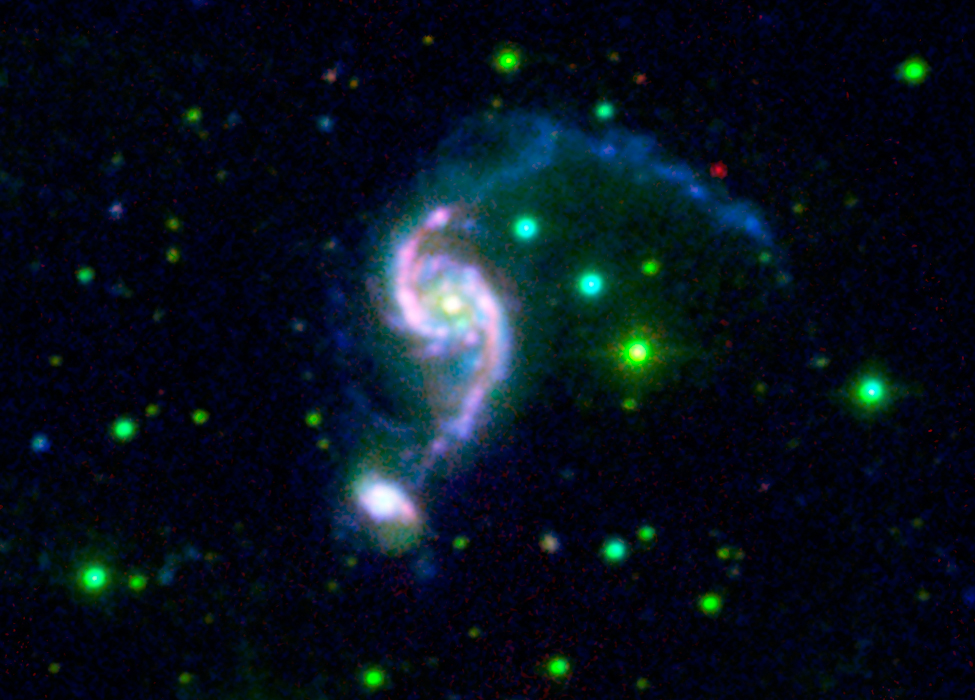
- A multiwavelength image of NGC 2535 and NGC 2536 (bottom). Mid-infrared emission is red, H alpha emission (at 694.0 nm) is green, and ultraviolet emission is blue.

Observation data (J2000 epoch)
- Constellation: Cancer
- Right ascension: 8^{h} 11^{m} 15.9^{s}
- Declination: +25° 10′ 46″
- Redshift: 4118 ± 17 km/s
- Apparent magnitude (V): 14.6

Characteristics
- Type: SB(rs)c pec
- Apparent size (V): 1.0′ × 0.5′

Other designations
- UGC 4264 NOTES01, PGC 22958, Arp 82 NED02

NGC 2536 is a barred spiral galaxy in the constellation Cancer. It was discovered on 22 January 1877 by French astronomer Édouard Stephan.

NGC 2536 has a prominent inner ring structure encircling the bar that is interacting with NGC 2535. The two galaxies are listed together as Arp 82 in the Atlas of Peculiar Galaxies as an example of a spiral galaxy with a high surface brightness companion.

== Supernova ==
One supernova has been observed in NGC 2536:

- SN 2014ds (Type IIb, mag. 16.3) was discovered by Zhijian Xu and Xing Gao on 11 October 2014.

== See also ==
- NGC 2535
- List of NGC objects (2001–3000)
