= NGC 2541 =

Galaxy in the constellation Lynx

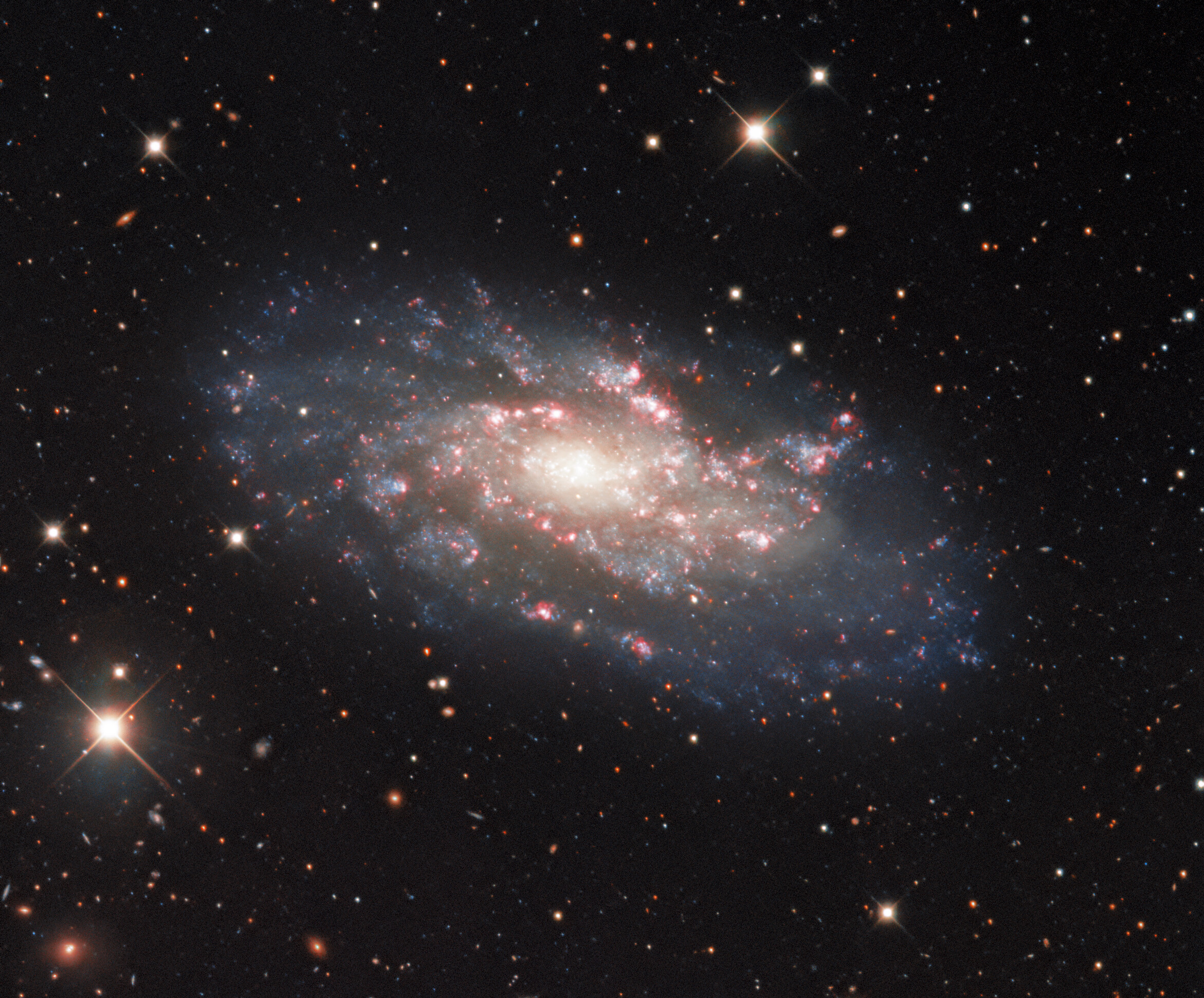
- NGC 2541 by Kitt Peak National Observatory

Observation data (J2000 epoch)
- Constellation: Lynx
- Right ascension: 08^{h} 14^{m} 40.1^{s}
- Declination: +49° 03′ 41″
- Redshift: 548 ± 1 km/s
- Distance: 41 ± 5 Mly (12.5 ± 1.4 Mpc)
- Apparent magnitude (V): 12.3
- Magnitude (J): 10.869
- Magnitude (H): 10.199
- Magnitude (K): 10.090

Characteristics
- Type: SA(s)cd
- Apparent size (V): 6.3′ × 3.2′

Other designations
- UGC 4284, PGC 23110

NGC 2541 is an unbarred spiral galaxy located about 40 million light-years away. It is in the NGC 2841 group of galaxies with NGC 2500, NGC 2537, and NGC 2552.

NGC 3432 is located inside the Lynx-Cancer Void with NGC 2500, NGC 2537, NGC 2552, NGC 2337 and IC 2450. Within NGC 2541, there is an Ultraluminous X-ray source Candidate ([SST2011] J081437.02+490326.6). NGC 2541 is considered to be in a Galaxy group known as LDC 558 which consists of 3 members, NGC 2500, NGC 2541 and NGC 2537. NGC 2541 is known to host at least 53 H II regions.
