= NGC 2500 =

Galaxy in the constellation Lynx

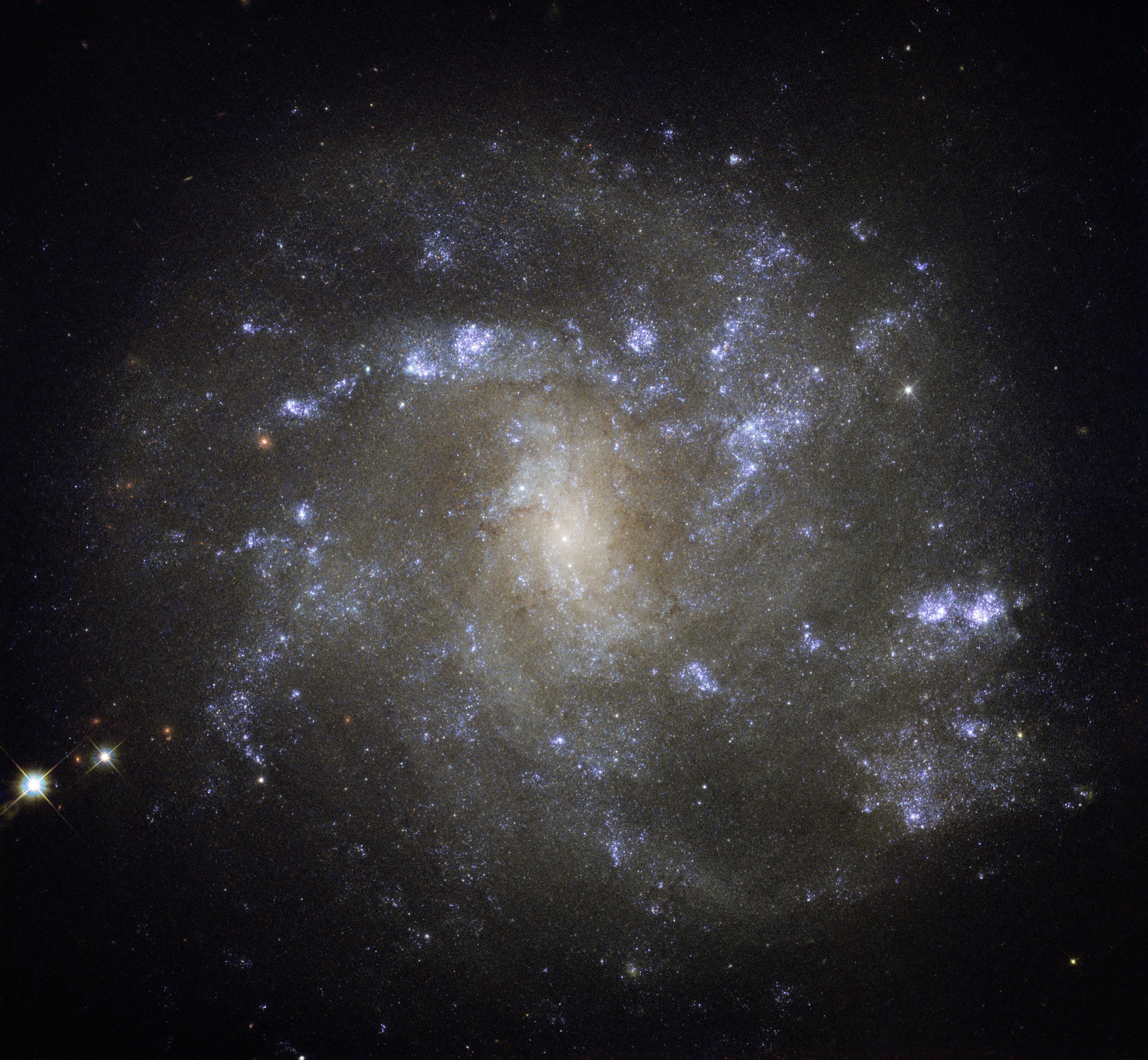
- NGC 2500 imaged by the Hubble Space Telescope

Observation data (J2000 epoch)
- Constellation: Lynx
- Right ascension: 08^{h} 01^{m} 53.2^{s}
- Declination: +50° 44′ 14″
- Redshift: 0.001715
- Heliocentric radial velocity: 514 ± 1 km/s
- Distance: 33 Mly (10.1 Mpc)
- Apparent magnitude (V): 12.2
- Magnitude (J): 10.790
- Magnitude (H): 10.160
- Magnitude (K): 9.276

Characteristics
- Type: SB(rs)d
- Apparent size (V): 2.9′ × 2.6′

Other designations
- UGC 4165, PGC 22525

NGC 2500 is a barred spiral galaxy in the constellation Lynx which was discovered by William Herschel in 1788. Much like the local group in which our own Milky Way galaxy is situated, NGC 2500 is part of the NGC 2841 group of galaxies which also includes NGC 2541, NGC 2537 and NGC 2552. It has a H II nucleus and exhibits a weak inner ring structure.

NGC 2500 is located inside the Lynx-Cancer Void, other galaxies inside are NGC 2537, NGC 2541, NGC 2552, NGC 2337 and IC 2450. There is a Quasar (SDSS J080157.85+504339.6) located in the background of NGC 2500. Other than that, there is candidate Ultraluminous X-ray Source detected within the galaxy NGC 2500.
