= NGC 2552 =

Magellanic Spiral galaxy in the constellation Lynx

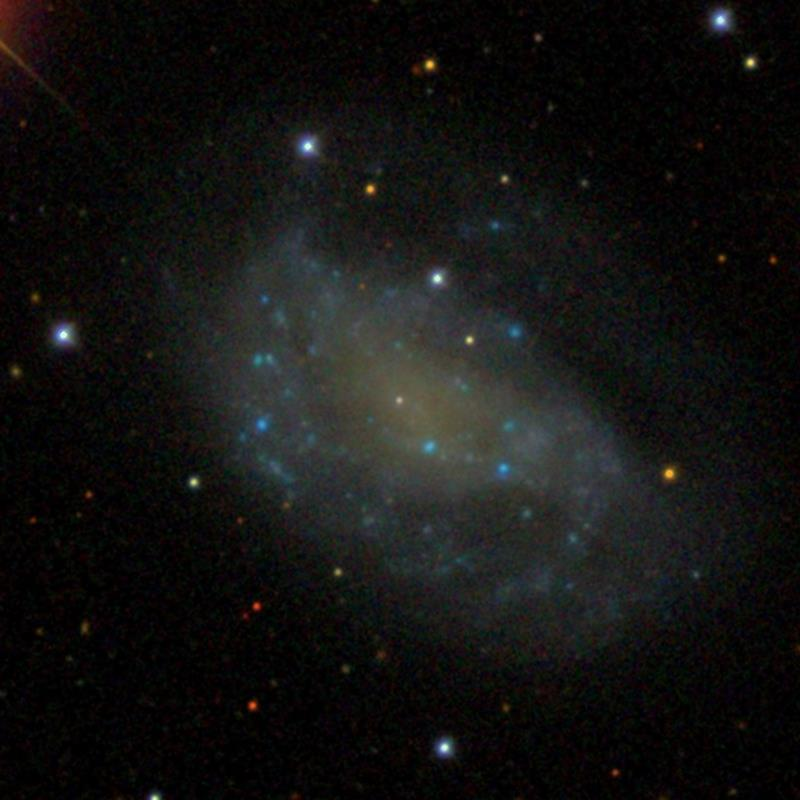
- SDSS image of NGC 2552

Observation data (J2000 epoch)
- Constellation: Lynx
- Right ascension: 08^{h} 19^{m} 19.58^{s}
- Declination: 50° 00′ 20.8″
- Distance: 22 Mly (6.7 Mpc)

Characteristics
- Type: SA(s)m

Other designations
- UGC 4325, PGC 23340

NGC 2552 is a Magellanic spiral galaxy located some 22 million light years away. It can be found in constellation of Lynx. This is a type of unbarred dwarf galaxy, usually with a single spiral arm. It is inclined by 41° to the line of sight from the Earth along a position angle of 229°. The measured velocity dispersion of the stars in NGC 2552 is relatively low—a mere 19 ± 2 km/s. This galaxy forms part of a loose triplet that includes NGC 2541 and NGC 2500, which together belong to the NGC 2841 group.

NGC 2552 is located inside the Lynx-Cancer Void with NGC 2500, NGC 2537, NGC 2337 and IC 2450.
