= NGC 2537 =

Blue compact dwarf galaxy in the constellation Lynx

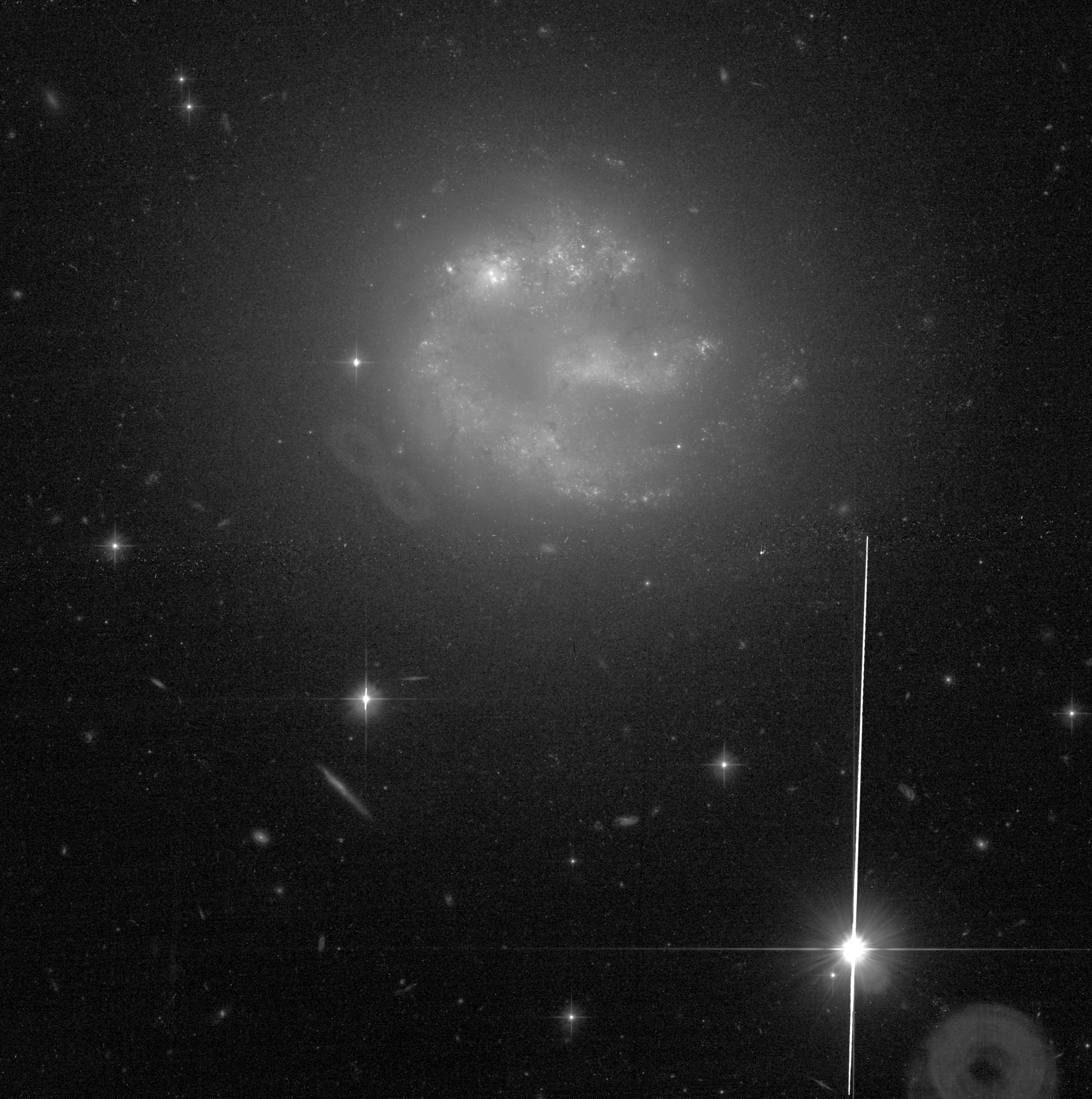
- NGC 2537 imaged by Hubble Space Telescope.

Observation data (J2000 epoch)
- Constellation: Lynx
- Right ascension: 8^{h} 13^{m} 14.6^{s}
- Declination: +45° 59′ 23″
- Redshift: 431 ± 1 km/s
- Apparent magnitude (V): 12.3

Characteristics
- Type: SB(rs)dm
- Apparent size (V): 1.7′ × 1.5′

Other designations
- Arp 6, UGC 4274, Mrk 86, PGC 23040

NGC 2537, also known as the Bear Paw Galaxy, Bear Claw Galaxy, Arp 6, or Mrk 86, is a blue compact dwarf galaxy in the constellation Lynx, located around 3 degrees NNW of 31 Lyncis. It was discovered on 6 February 1788 by German-British astronomer William Herschel.

NGC 2537 belongs to the iE class of Blue Compact Dwarf (BCD) classification, which is described as galactic spectra with an underlying smooth elliptical Low Surface Brightness component with a superimposed "knotted" star formation component (Gil de Paz et al., 2000, Page 378 Astron. Astrophys. Suppl. Ser. 145).

NGC 2537 was long thought to be possibly interacting with IC 2233. However, even though they may lie at the same distance, neither display the hallmarks of a mutual interaction.

Although no supernovae have been observed in NGC 2537 yet, a luminous blue variable, designated AT 2017be (type LBV, mag. 18.5), was discovered on 6 January 2017.

NGC 2537 is located in inside the Lynx-Cancer Void, along with many other galaxies such as NGC 2500, NGC 2541, NGC 2552, NGC 2337 and IC 2450.

== Gallery ==
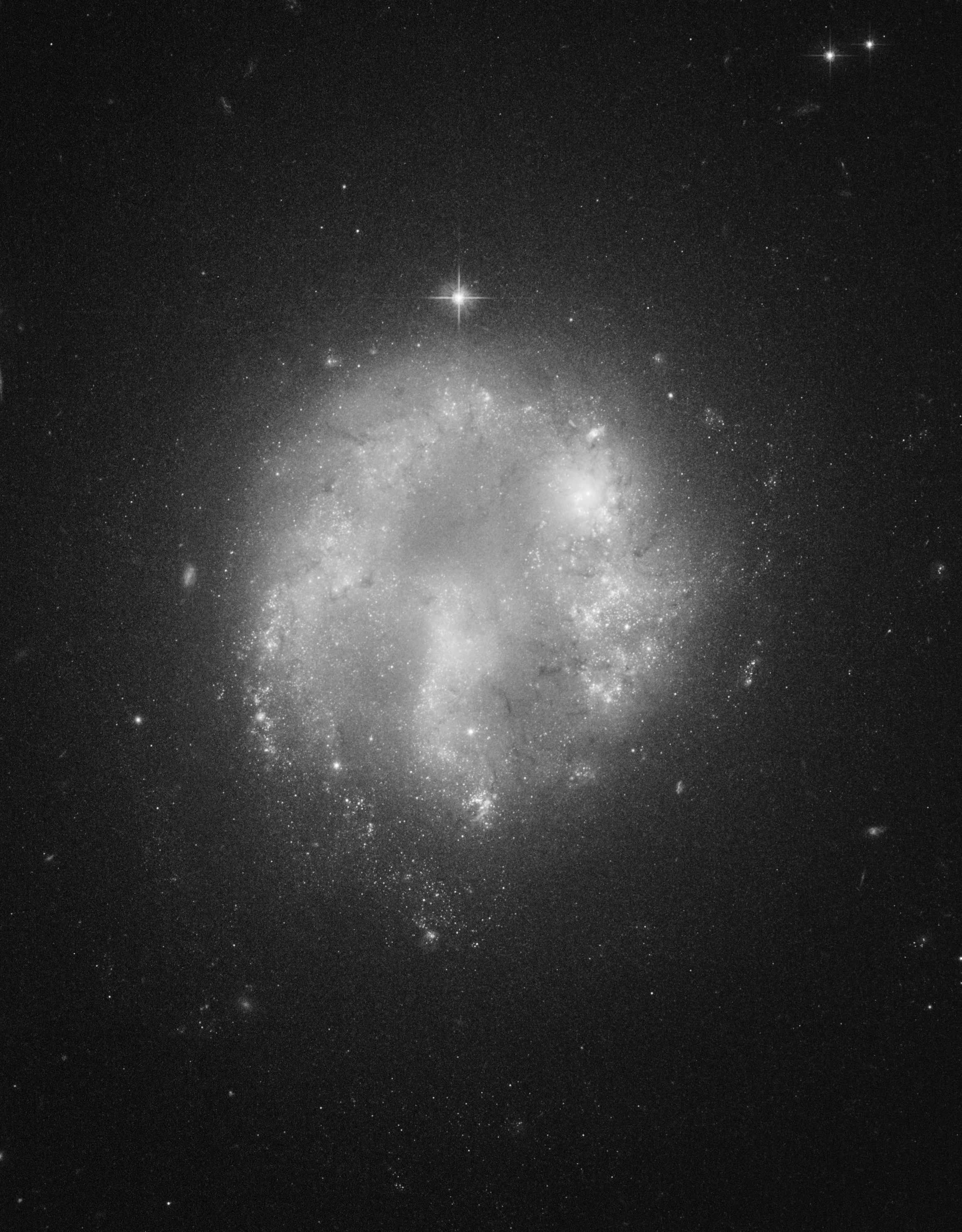
NGC 2537 with Hubble

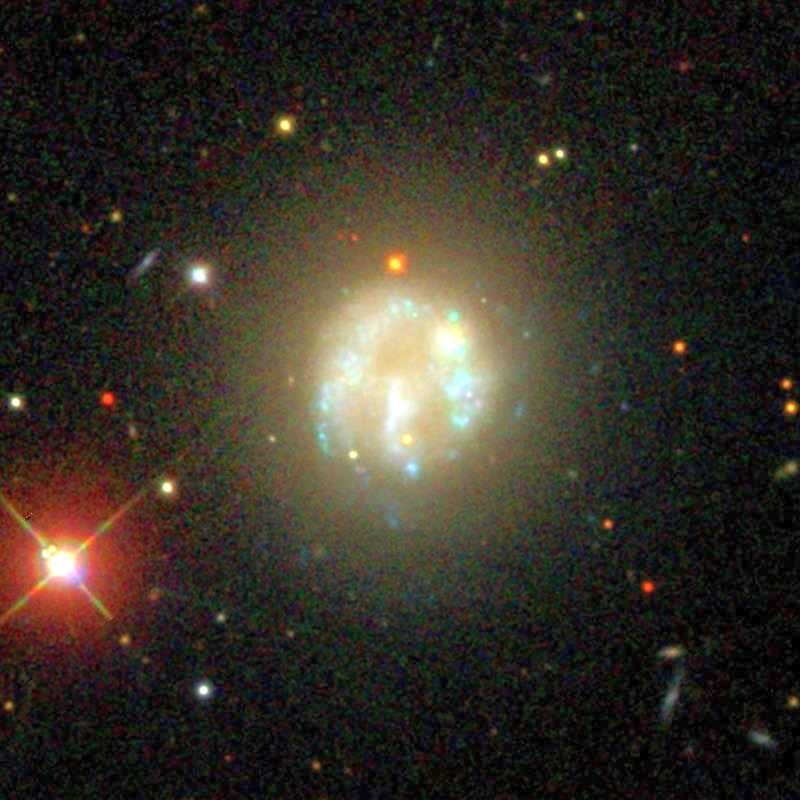
NGC 2537 with SDSS

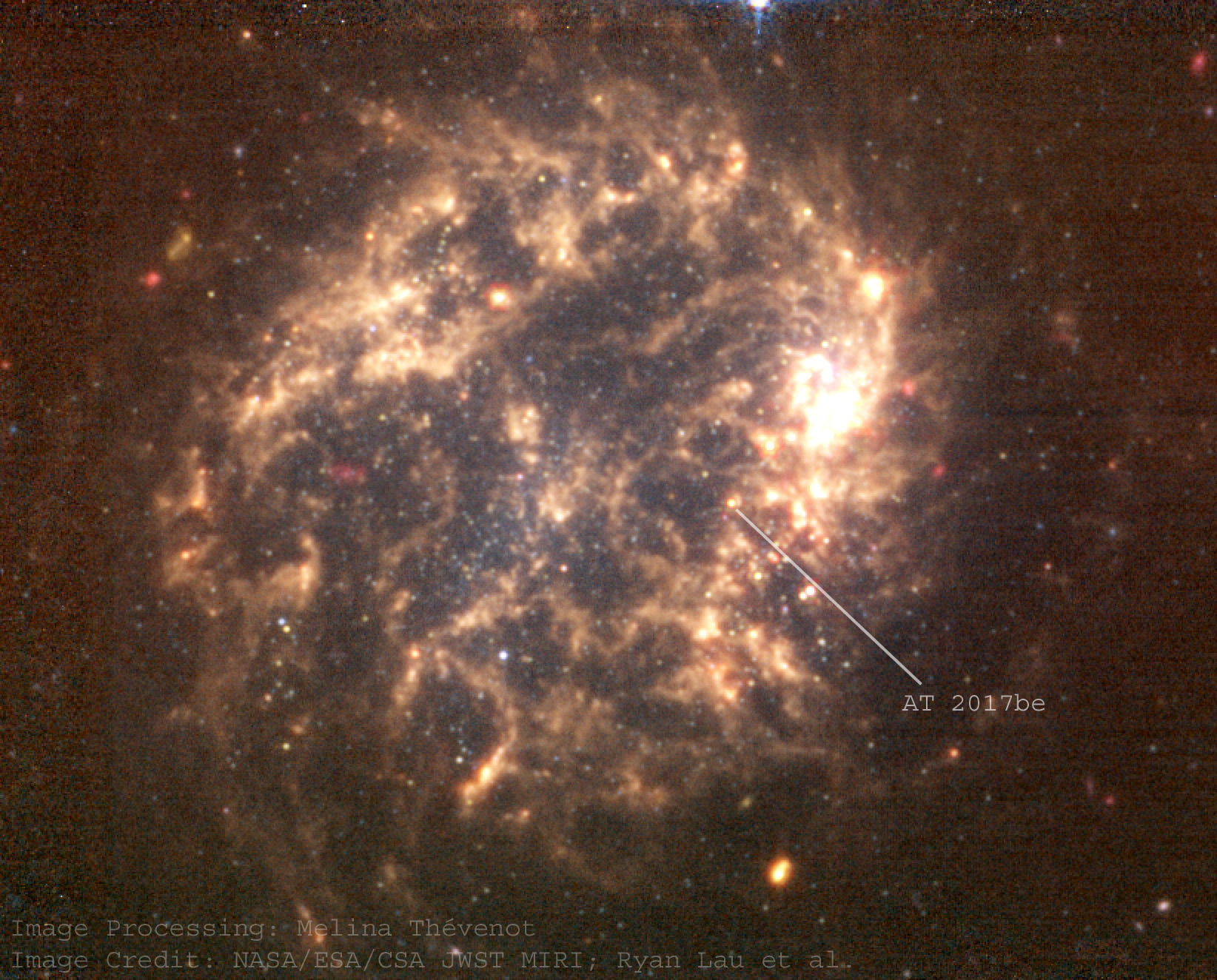
James Webb Space Telescope MIRI image with the AT 2017be marked

== See also ==
- List of NGC objects (2001–3000)
