= Chi Ursae Majoris =

Star in the constellation Ursa Major

- Location of χ Ursae Majoris (circled)

Observation data Epoch J2000.0 Equinox J2000.0 (ICRS)
- Constellation: Ursa Major
- Right ascension: 11^{h} 46^{m} 03.01407^{s}
- Declination: +47° 46′ 45.8553″
- Apparent magnitude (V): 3.72

Characteristics
- Evolutionary stage: Horizontal branch
- Spectral type: K0.5 IIIb
- U−B color index: +1.16
- B−V color index: +1.18

Astrometry
Radial velocity (R_{v})	−9.02±0.20 km/s
Proper motion (μ)	RA: −138.297 mas/yr Dec.: +28.66 mas/yr
Parallax (π)	16.438±0.113 mas
Distance	198 ± 1 ly (60.8 ± 0.4 pc)
Absolute magnitude (M_{V})	0.10±0.02

Details
Mass	1.49 M_{☉}
Radius	23.15±0.21 R_{☉}
Luminosity	170.1±5.3 L_{☉}
Surface gravity (log g)	2.2 cgs
Temperature	4,331±33 K
Metallicity [Fe/H]	−0.44 dex
Rotational velocity (v sin i)	2.3 km/s

Other designations
- Taiyangshou, Alkaphrah, Alkafzah, Chi UMa, χ UMa, 63 Ursae Majoris, BD+48°1966, FK5 441, HD 102224, HIP 57399, HR 4518, SAO 43886

Database references
SIMBAD	data

Chi Ursae Majoris or χ Ursae Majoris, formally named Taiyangshou /ˌtaɪˌjæŋˈʃoʊ/, is a single star in the northern circumpolar constellation of Ursa Major. The star has an orange hue and is visible to the naked eye at night with an apparent visual magnitude of 3.72. It is located at a distance of approximately 198 light-years from the Sun based on parallax, but is drifting closer with a radial velocity of −9 km/s.

== Nomenclature ==
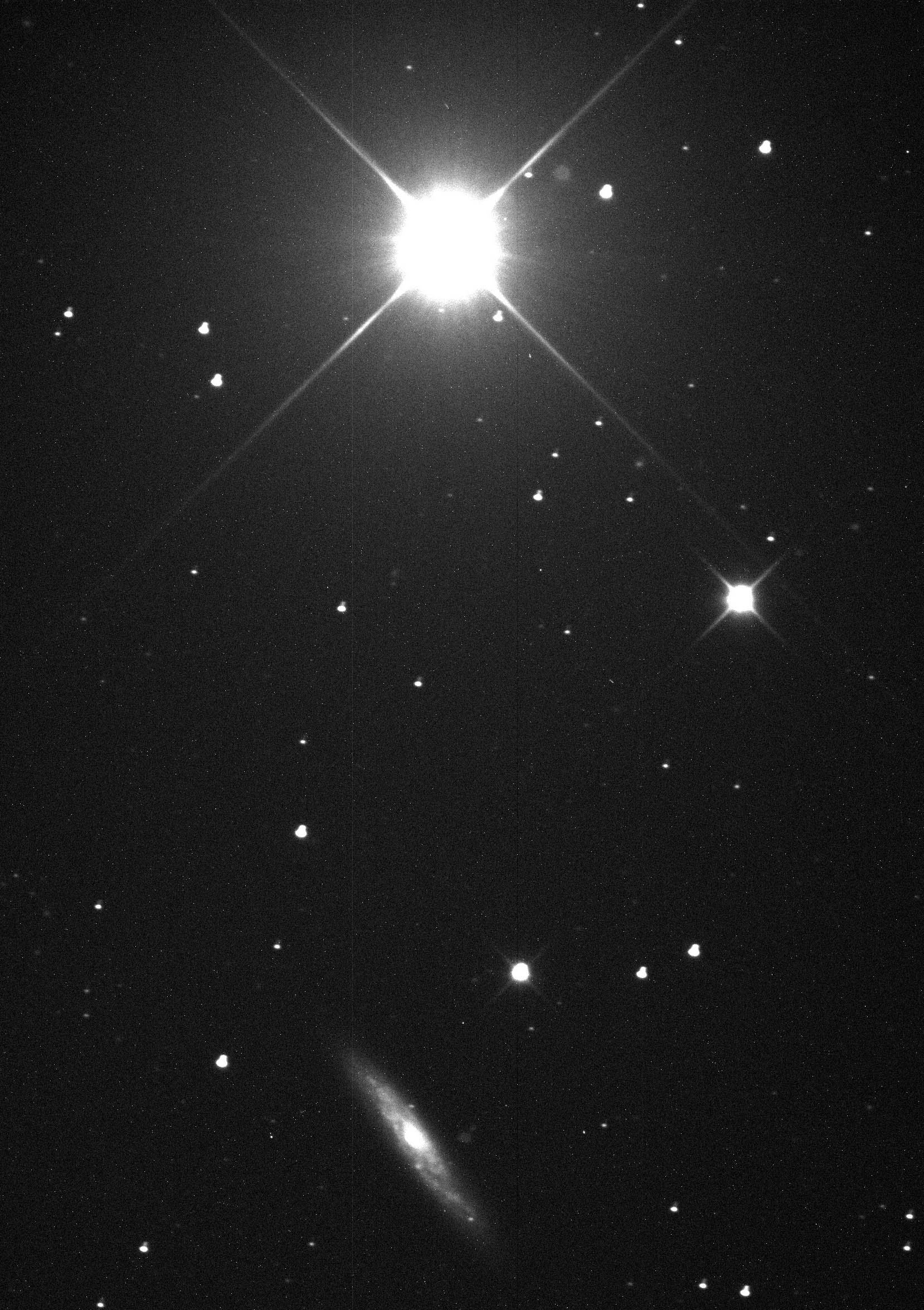
Chi Ursae Majoris and NGC 3877

χ Ursae Majoris (Latinised to Chi Ursae Majoris) is the star's Bayer designation.

It bore the traditional name Taiyangshou (太陽守, Pinyin: Tàiyángshǒu), meaning Guard of the Sun, from Chinese astronomy. It is a single-star asterism in the Purple Forbidden enclosure (see: Chinese constellations). In R. H. Allen's Star Names, this name was transliterated as Tai Yang Show, "the Sun Governor". The star has also been called Alkafzah, Al Kaphrah, or El Kophrah, from Arabic القفزة al-qafzah "the leap [of the gazelle]", which refers to an asterism consisting of ι, κ, λ, μ, ν, and ξ Ursae Majoris.

In 2016, the IAU organized a Working Group on Star Names (WGSN) to catalog and standardize proper names for stars. The WGSN approved the name Taiyangshou for this star on 30 June 2017 and it is now so included in the List of IAU-approved Star Names. The name Alkaphrah was approved for κ Ursae Majoris A.

== Properties ==
Chi Ursae Majoris is an evolved, orange hued K-type giant with a stellar classification of K0.5 IIIb. It is a red clump giant, which means it is on the horizontal branch and is generating energy through helium fusion at its core. This star has expanded to 23 times the radius of the Sun with 1.49 times the Sun's mass. It is radiating 170 times the luminosity of the Sun from its enlarged photosphere at an effective temperature of 4,331 K.

The spiral galaxy in Ursa Major, NGC 3877 (= H I.201), type Sc, is best found from Chi Ursae Majoris, which is almost exactly 15 arcminutes north of the galaxy.
