= Al Kaphrah =

Al Kaphrah, Alkafzah, or similar may refer to one of two stars in Ursa Major:

- κ Ursae Majoris (officially named Alkaphrah)
- χ Ursae Majoris (officially named Taiyangshou)

This name is derived from Arabic القفزة al-qafzah "the leap [of the gazelle]".
