= Kappa Ursae Majorids =

Minor meteor Shower

Kappa Ursae Majorids (KUM) is a minor meteor shower associated with the constellation Ursa Major. It is usually active annually from October 28 to November 17, with a peak around November 6.

The radiant point of this shower is near the star Kappa Ursae Majoris, located at right ascension 10:27 and declination +42°. Meteors from this shower enter the atmosphere at a velocity of approximately 65 km/s. KUM is a weak shower, typically producing less than one meteor per hour, making observation challenging.

== Observation ==
Due to their high northern radiant, these meteors are best observed from the Northern Hemisphere during the last hour before dawn, when the radiant is highest in the sky. Observers in the Southern Hemisphere have limited visibility.

Kappa Ursae Majorids meteors were first identified by Japanese observers following an outburst on November 5, 2009.
