= NGC 3877 =

Galaxy in the constellation Ursa Major

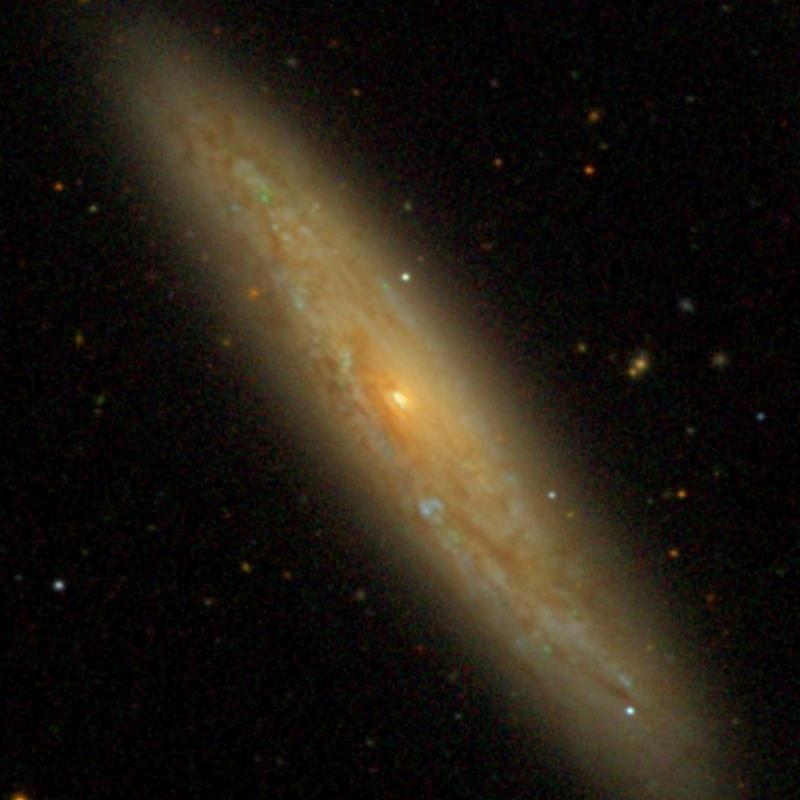
- NGC 3877 imaged by SDSS

Observation data (J2000 epoch)
- Constellation: Ursa Major
- Right ascension: 11^{h} 46^{m} 07.7281^{s}
- Declination: +47° 29′ 40.369″
- Redshift: 0.002987
- Heliocentric radial velocity: 895 ± 4 km/s
- Distance: 50.5 ± 4.2 Mly (15.5 ± 1.3 Mpc)
- Apparent magnitude (V): 11.2

Characteristics
- Type: Sc
- Size: ~80,900 ly (24.80 kpc) (estimated)
- Apparent size (V): 5.3′ × 1.2′

Other designations
- IRAS 11434+4746, NGC 3877, UGC 6745, MCG +08-22-002, PGC 36699, CGCG 243-004

NGC 3877 is a spiral galaxy in the northern constellation of Ursa Major, to the south of the magnitude 3.7 star Chi Ursae Majoris. It was discovered by the German-British astronomer William Herschel on February 5, 1788. This galaxy has a visual magnitude of 11.2 and spans an angular size of 5.3′ × 1.2′. It lies at a distance of 50.5 ± 4.2 million light-years (15.5 ± 1.3 Mpc).

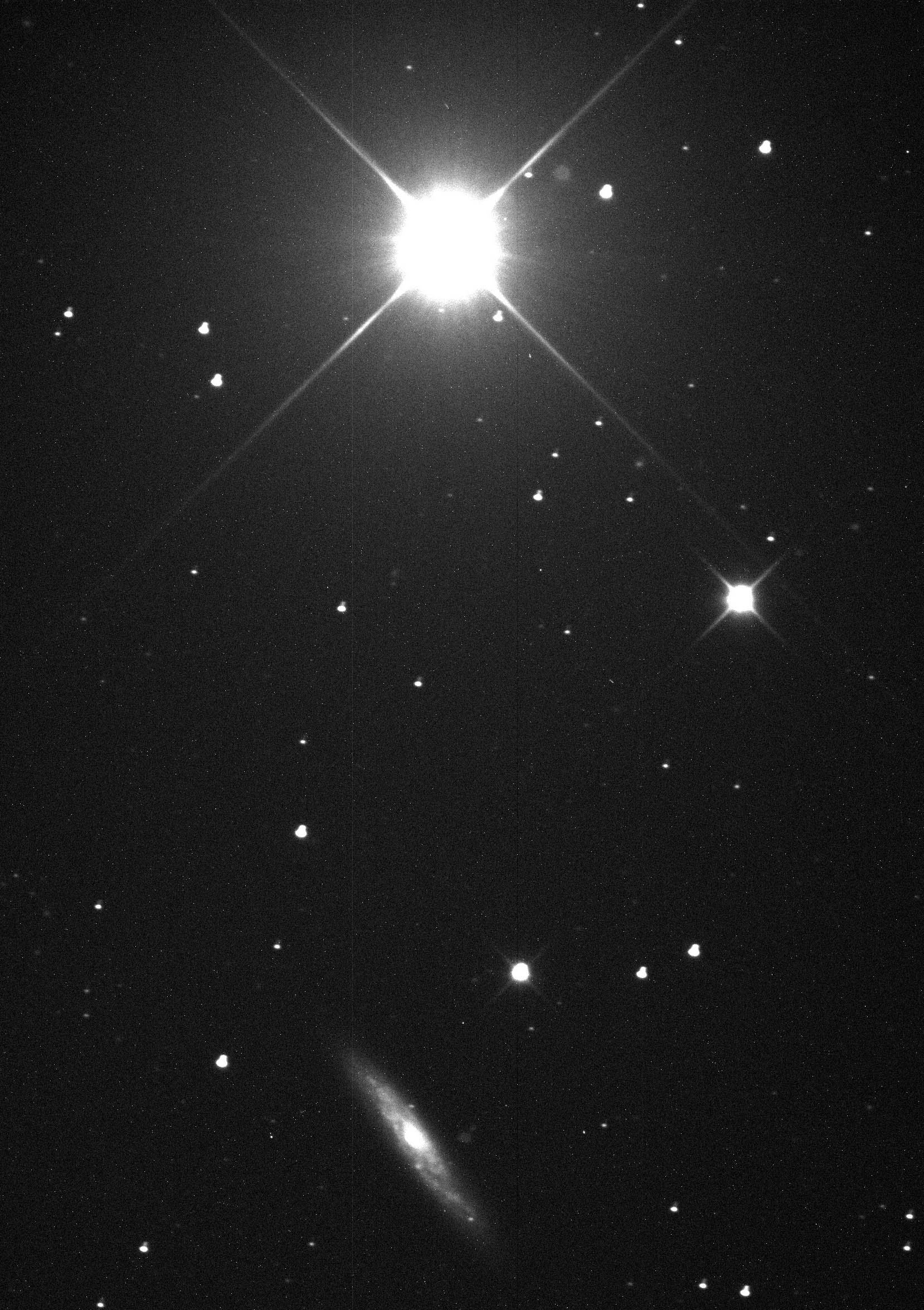
NGC 3877 next to the 3.7 magnatude star Chi Ursae Majoris (χ UMa)

One supernova has been observed in NGC 3877: SN 1998S (Type IIn, mag. 15.2) was discovered by the BAO Supernova Survey on 3 March 1998.

NGC 3877 is a member of the M109 Group, a group of galaxies located in the constellation Ursa Major that may contain over 50 galaxies. The brightest galaxy in the group is the spiral galaxy M109.

== See also ==
- List of NGC objects (3001–4000)
