= SN 1998S =

Supernova in the constellation Ursa Major

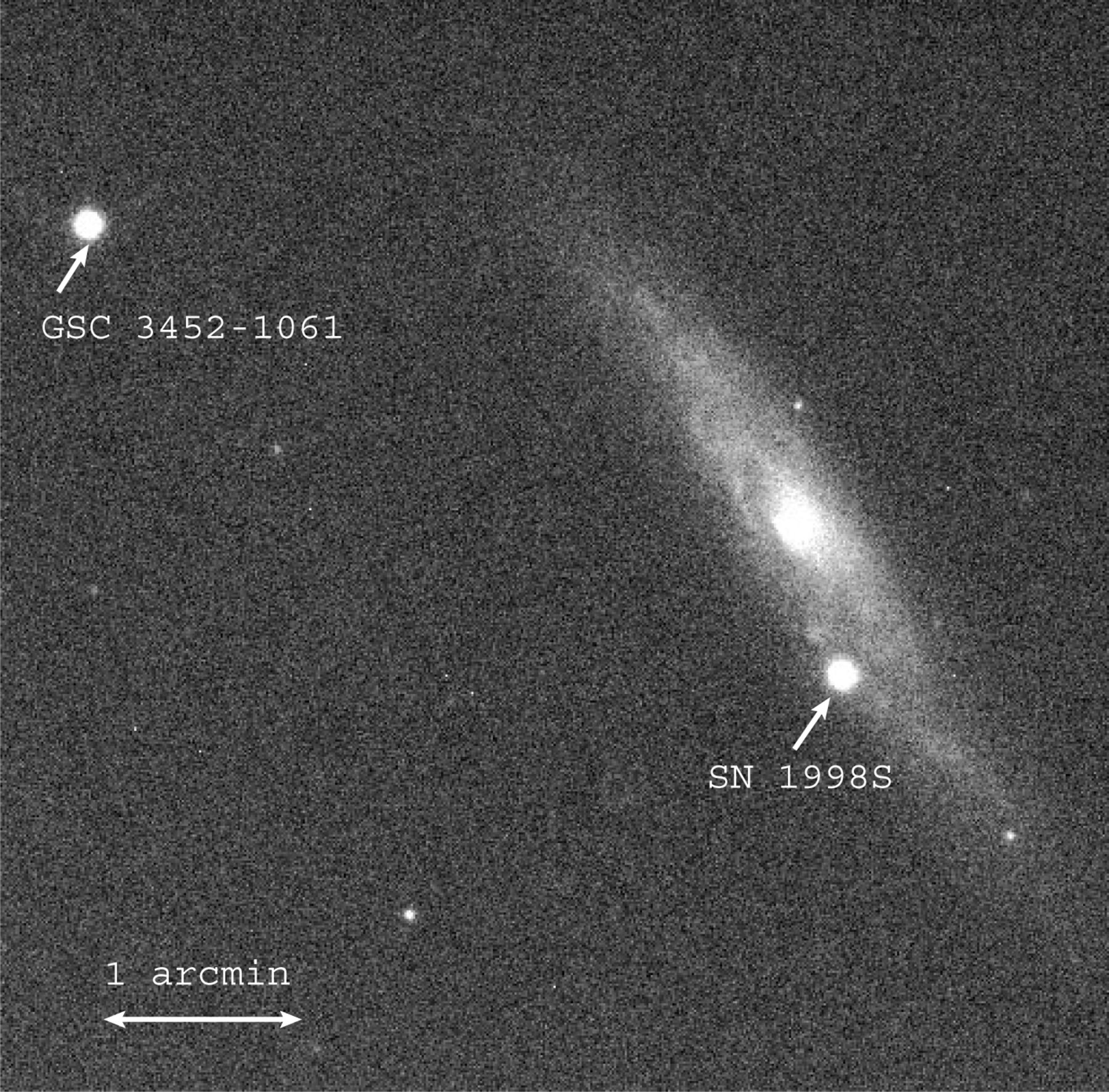
- R-band image of SN 1998S in NGC 3877 obtained on 1998 March 16.1 ut at t he Jacobus Kapteyn Telescope (JKT), La Palma (north is up and east is to the left).
- Event type: Supernova
- IIn
- Date: c. 50.5 million years ago (detected 2 March 1998 by Z. Wan)
- Constellation: Ursa Major
- Right ascension: 11^{h} 46^{m} 06.25^{s}
- Declination: +47° 28' 55.5"
- Epoch: J2000.0
- Galactic coordinates: 150.7467 +65.9637
- Distance: c. 50.5 million ly
- Host: NGC 3877
- Progenitor type: maybe Red supergiant
- Colour (B-V): ~ 0.2 mag
- Notable features: SN 1998S, AAVSO 1140+48
- Peak apparent magnitude: 12 mag
- Other designations: SN 1998S, 2MASS J11460613+4728553, AAVSO 1140+48

SN 1998S was a Type IIn supernova that was detected in NGC 3877 in March 1998. At the time of discovery, SN 1998S was the brightest Type IIn event observed, although later outshone by SN 2010jl.

It was discovered on 1998 March 2.68 UT in NGC 3877 by Z. Wan at a broadband (unfiltered) optical magnitude of +15.2.

Its spectrum showed prominent H and He emission lines with narrow peaks and broad wings, superimposed on a blue continuum. These narrow lines indicate the presence of a dense circumstellar medium (CSM) in the vicinity of the supernova. The high luminosity of SN1998S is due to the interaction of fast material (ejecta) with previously-expelled slowly-expanding material (CSM), which can more effectively convert kinetic energy of ejecta into radiation energy.
