= NGC 3000 =

Double star in the constellation Ursa Major

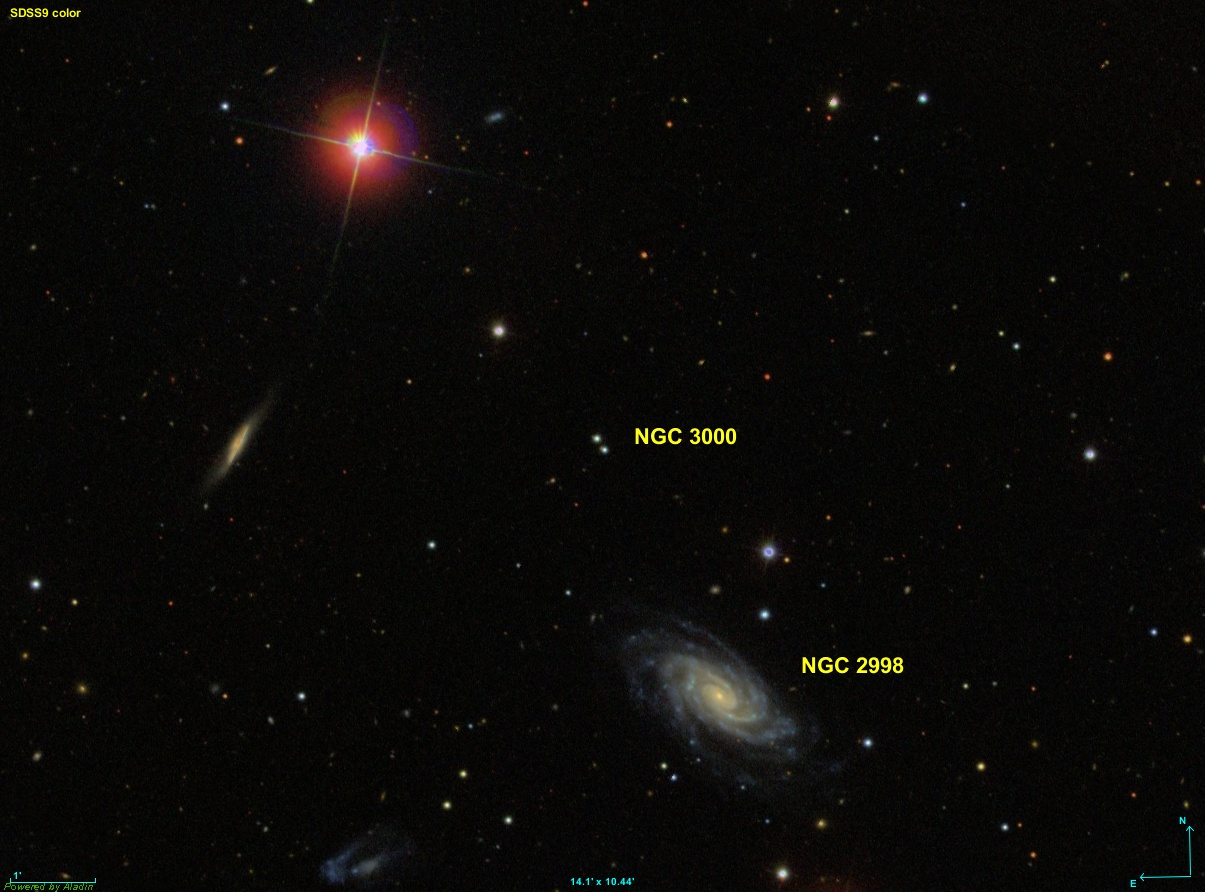
- NGC 3000 (center)

Observation data (J2000 epoch)
- Constellation: Ursa Major
- Right ascension: 09h 48m 51s
- Declination: +44° 07’ 49”
- Distance: 168 Mly (51.66 Mpc)
- Apparent magnitude (V): 10.88
- Apparent magnitude (B): 11

Characteristics
- Type: SB(r)bc
- Notable features: N/A

Other designations
- PGC 5067534

NGC 3000 is a double star located in the constellation Ursa Major. It was first discovered and observed by Bindon Stoney an assistant to William Parsons, on January 25, 1851, and was initially catalogued as a nebula-like object. Since its discovery, NGC 3000 has been observed and studied using various telescopes.

== Discovery ==
Bindon Stoney first described NGC 3000 as a "very faint, small, irregularly round, mottled but not resolved" galaxy. However, its recorded position, precessed to RA 09 49 02.6, Dec +44 08 46, shows no object at that location. Analysis reveals Stoney's recorded positions for objects in this region consistently have a systematic error of approximately 2 arcminutes to the east-northeast. Applying this correction places the coordinates nearly precisely on a pair of stars now identified as NGC 3000.
