= Iota Ursae Majoris =

Double binary star system in the constellation Ursa Major

- Location of ι Ursae Majoris (circled)

Observation data Epoch J2000 Equinox ICRS
- Constellation: Ursa Major
- Right ascension: 08^{h} 59^{m} 12.45362^{s}
- Declination: +48° 02′ 30.5741″
- Apparent magnitude (V): 3.14/10.1/10.3

Characteristics
- Spectral type: A7V(n) + M3V + M4V
- U−B color index: +0.08
- B−V color index: +0.19
- Variable type: Suspected

Astrometry
Radial velocity (R_{v})	+9.0 km/s
Proper motion (μ)	RA: -441.29 mas/yr Dec.: -215.32 mas/yr
Parallax (π)	68.92±0.16 mas
Distance	47.3 ± 0.1 ly (14.51 ± 0.03 pc)
Absolute magnitude (M_{V})	+2.31

Orbit
Primary	ι UMa A
Name	ι UMa BC
Period (P)	2084 ± 15 yr
Semi-major axis (a)	16.7 ± 0.3″
Eccentricity (e)	0.90 ± 0.02
Inclination (i)	54 ± 4°
Longitude of the node (Ω)	134 ± 2°
Periastron epoch (T)	B 2029 ± 1
Argument of periastron (ω) (secondary)	23 ± 5°

Details

ι UMa Aa
Mass	1.7 ± 0.1 M_{☉}
Radius	1.67 R_{☉}
Luminosity	8.98 L_{☉}
Surface gravity (log g)	4.30 ± 0.07 cgs
Temperature	8,242 K
Metallicity [Fe/H]	0.01±0.05 dex
Rotational velocity (v sin i)	154 km/s
Age	620 Myr

Ab
Mass	1±0.3 M_{☉}

ι UMa B
Mass	0.35 ± 0.05 M_{☉}
Radius	0.46 R_{☉}

ι UMa C
Mass	0.30 ± 0.05 M_{☉}
Radius	0.43 R_{☉}

Other designations
- Talitha, ι UMa, 9 UMa, BD+48 1707, FK5 335, GJ 331, HD 76644, HIP 44127, HR 3569, SAO 42630, WDS J08592+4803A,BC

Database references
SIMBAD	ι UMa
- ι UMa A
- ι UMa BC
ARICNS	ι UMa A
- ι UMa B
- ι UMa C

Iota Ursae Majoris, also named Talitha /ˈtælɪθə/, is a star system in the northern circumpolar constellation of Ursa Major. It has an apparent visual magnitude of 3.14, making it visible to the naked eye and placing it among the brighter members of this constellation. Based upon parallax measurements, it is located at a distance of 47.3 light-years (14.5 parsecs) from the Sun.

== Nomenclature ==
ι Ursae Majoris (Latinised to Iota Ursae Majoris, abbreviated Iota UMa, ι UMa) is the star's Bayer designation.

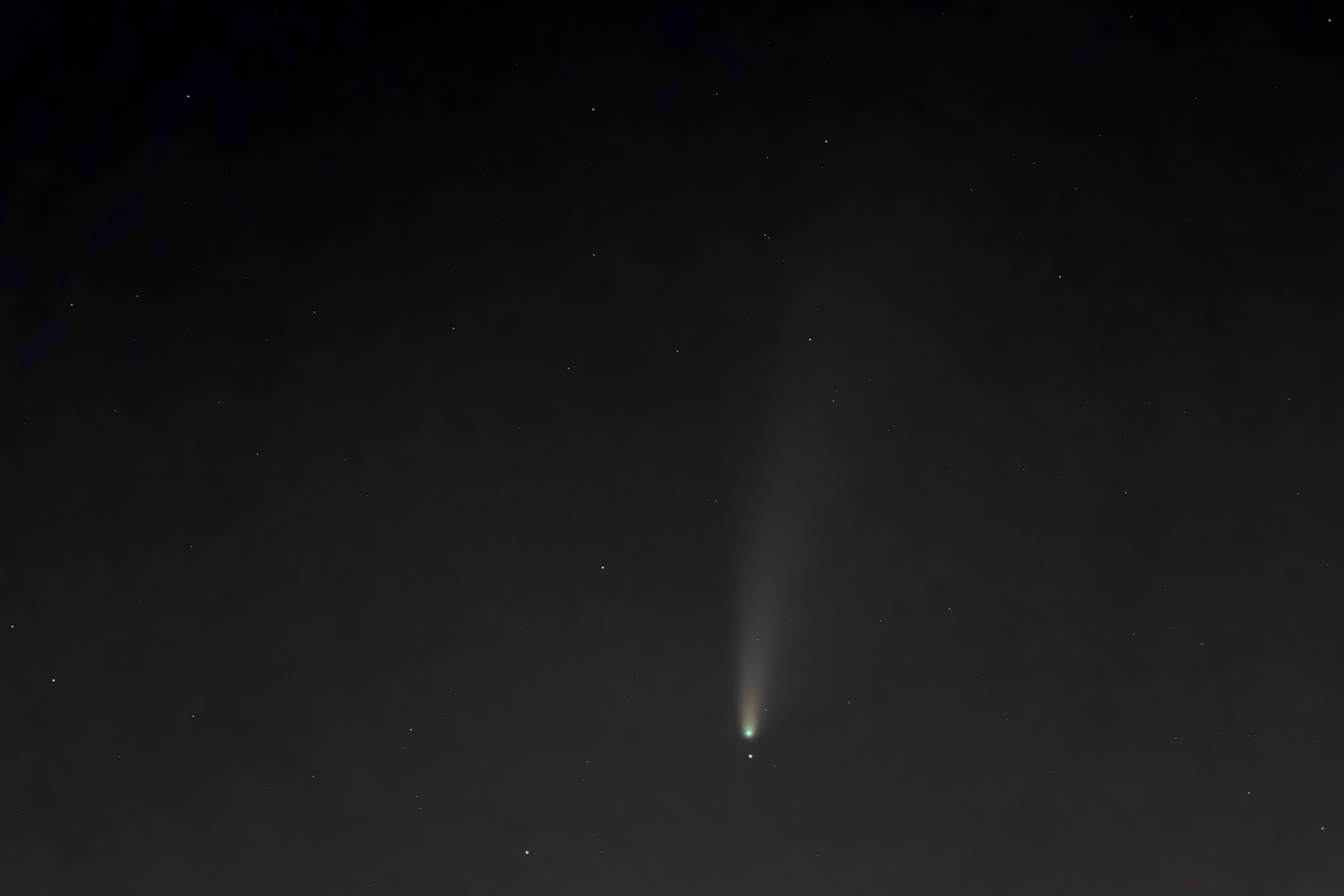
Iota Ursae Majoris in conjunction with comet NEOWISE on 18 July 2020 17° above the north horizon of Berlin

The traditional name Talitha comes from the Arabic phrase Al Ḳafzah al Thalitha (Arabic: القفزة الثالثة), which means "the third spring, or leap, of the gazelle". It sometimes shared this name with κ Ursae Majoris, which together formed the third of three "leaps of the gazelle"; ι was rarely called Talitha Borealis, "northern Talitha" in Latin. In 2016, the International Astronomical Union organized a Working Group on Star Names (WGSN) to catalog and standardize proper names for stars. The WGSN's first bulletin of July 2016 included a table of the first two batches of names approved by the WGSN; which included Talitha for Iota Ursae Majoris Aa.

In Chinese astronomy, 三台 (Sān Tái), meaning Three Steps, refers to an asterism consisting of ι Ursae Majoris, Kappa Ursae Majoris, Lambda Ursae Majoris, Mu Ursae Majoris, Nu Ursae Majoris and Xi Ursae Majoris. Consequently, the Chinese name for ι Ursae Majoris itself is 上台一 (Shàng Tái yī, English: Star of First Upper Step).

The star was also dubbed Dnoces ('Second' backwards) in honor of Edward H. White II, an Apollo 1 astronaut. The name was invented in 1967 by the Apollo 9 crew and Dr. Clarence Cleminshaw of the Griffith Observatory (not his fellow astronaut Gus Grissom as is often claimed).

== Stellar system ==
The Iota Ursae Majoris system is composed of two sets of binary stars. The two binary systems orbit around each other once every 2,084 years. The apparent separation between the two binaries is rapidly decreasing as they follow their orbits. In 1841 when the B component was first discovered, they had a separation of 10.7 arcseconds, or at least 156 AU. By 1971 their separation had decreased to 4.5 arcseconds, or at least 66 AU. This system appears to be dynamically unstable with a high likelihood and may become disrupted on a time scale on the order of 10^{5} years.

The brightest component is a white A-type subgiant. It is a member of a spectroscopic binary system whose components have an orbital period of 4,028 days. The companion, which has not been directly observed, is thought to be a white dwarf with a mass of 1.0 ± 0.3 M_{☉}.

The companion binary is composed of the 9th magnitude and 10th magnitude stars, both of which are red dwarfs. These two red dwarfs, designated Iota Ursae Majoris B and C respectively, orbit around each other with a period of 39.7 years, and are separated by roughly 0.7 arcseconds, or at least 10 AU. This pair may be the source of the X-ray emission detected from this system.

== See also ==
- Gamma Velorum, informally named Regor for astronaut Roger B. Chaffee
- Gamma Cassiopeiae, informally named Navi for astronaut Virgil Ivan "Gus" Grissom
