= Nu Ursae Majoris =

Star in the constellation Ursa Major

- Location of ν Ursae Majoris (circled)

Observation data Epoch J2000.0 Equinox J2000.0 (ICRS)
- Constellation: Ursa Major
- Right ascension: 11^{h} 18^{m} 28.73720^{s}
- Declination: +33° 05′ 39.5109″
- Apparent magnitude (V): +3.490

Characteristics
- Spectral type: K3 III
- U−B color index: +1.550
- B−V color index: +1.400

Astrometry
Radial velocity (R_{v})	-9.63 ± 0.38 km/s
Proper motion (μ)	RA: −26.139 mas/yr Dec.: 27.892 mas/yr
Parallax (π)	8.17±0.17 mas
Distance	399 ± 8 ly (122 ± 3 pc)
Absolute magnitude (M_{V})	−2.47 ± 0.16

Details
Mass	3.82±0.23 M_{☉}
Radius	60+1.24 −1.29 R_{☉}
Luminosity	1242±81 L_{☉}
Surface gravity (log g)	1.89 cgs
Temperature	4,422±26 K
Metallicity [Fe/H]	–0.04 dex
Rotational velocity (v sin i)	10 km/s
Age	200±30 Myr

Other designations
- Alula Borealis, ν Ursae Majoris, ν UMa, Nu UMa, 54 Ursae Majoris, BD+33 2098, CCDM J11185+3306A, FK5 425, GC 15547, HD 98262, HIP 55219, HR 4377, IDS 11131+3338 A, PPM 75790, SAO 62486, WDS J11185+3306A

Database references
SIMBAD	data

Nu Ursae Majoris (ν Ursae Majoris, abbreviated Nu UMa, ν UMa), formally named Alula Borealis /əˈluːlə bɒriˈælɪs/, is a double star in the northern circumpolar constellation of Ursa Major. At an apparent visual magnitude of +3.490, it is bright enough to be seen with the naked eye. Based upon parallax measurements, the distance to ν Ursae Majoris is about 399 light-years (122 parsecs). At such distance, its apparent brightness is diminished by 0.48 magnitudes due to interveining gas and dust.

This is a giant star with a stellar classification of K3 III. Being 200 million years old, it has expanded to about 60 times the radius of the Sun and is radiating 1240 times the Sun's luminosity. The effective temperature of the outer envelope is 4,422 K; cool enough to give it an orange hue typical of a K-type star. It has a 10th-magnitude optical companion at an angular separation of 7.1 arcseconds.

== Nomenclature ==
ν Ursae Majoris (Latinised to Nu Ursae Majoris) is the star's Bayer designation.

It also bore the traditional name of Alula Borealis. Alula (shared with Xi Ursae Majoris) comes from the Arabic phrase Al Ḳafzah al Ūla 'the First Spring'. and Borealis is Latin for 'northern'. In 2016, the International Astronomical Union organized a Working Group on Star Names (WGSN) to catalog and standardize proper names for stars. The WGSN's first bulletin of July 2016 included a table of the first two batches of names approved by the WGSN; which included Alula Borealis for this star.

In Chinese, 三台 (Sān Tái), meaning Three Steps, refers to an asterism consisting of Nu Ursae Majoris, Iota Ursae Majoris, Kappa Ursae Majoris, Lambda Ursae Majoris, Mu Ursae Majoris, and Xi Ursae Majoris. Consequently, the Chinese name for Nu Ursae Majoris itself is 下台一 (Xià Tái yī, English: Star of First Lower Step).
