= Xi Ursae Majoris =

Star system in the constellation Ursa Major

- The red circle shows the location of Xi Ursae Majoris in Ursa Major.

Observation data Epoch J2000 Equinox ICRS
- Constellation: Ursa Major
- Pronunciation: /æˈluːlə ɔːˈstreɪlɪs/
- ξ UMa A
- Right ascension: 11^{h} 18^{m} 10.902^{s}
- Declination: +31° 31′ 44.98″
- Apparent magnitude (V): 4.264
- ξ UMa B
- Right ascension: 11^{h} 18^{m} 10.950^{s}
- Declination: +31° 31′ 45.74″
- Apparent magnitude (V): 4.729

Characteristics
- Spectral type: F8.5:V / G2V
- U−B color index: 0.04
- B−V color index: 0.59
- Variable type: RS CVn

Astrometry
| Radial velocity (R_{v}) | −18.2±2.7 km/s |
| Proper motion (μ) | RA: −339.398 mas/yr Dec.: −607.892 mas/yr |
| Parallax (π) | 114.4867±0.4316 mas |
| Distance | 28.5 ± 0.1 ly (8.73 ± 0.03 pc) |

ξ UMa Aa
| Absolute magnitude (M_{V}) | 4.66 (Note: Calculated from the bolometric magnitude 4.54 ± 0.06 and the bolometric correction −0.12 ± 0.05 using the formula: BC = M_{bol} − M_{V}) |
| Absolute bolometric magnitude (M_{bol}) | 4.54±0.06 |

ξ UMa Ba
| Absolute magnitude (M_{V}) | 5.16 (Note: Calculated from the bolometric magnitude 5.00 ± 0.06 and the bolometric correction −0.16 ± 0.05 using the formula: BC = M_{bol} − M_{V}) |
| Absolute bolometric magnitude (M_{bol}) | 5.00±0.06 |

Orbit
| Primary | ξ UMa A |
| Name | ξ UMa B |
| Period (P) | 59.878 yr |
| Semi-major axis (a) | 2.536″ |
| Eccentricity (e) | 0.398 |
| Inclination (i) | 127.94° |
| Longitude of the node (Ω) | 101.85 (ascending)° |
| Periastron epoch (T) | 1935.195 |

Orbit
| Primary | ξ UMa Aa |
| Name | ξ UMa Ab |
| Period (P) | 1.832 yr |
| Semi-major axis (a) | 0.057″ |
| Eccentricity (e) | 0.53 |
| Inclination (i) | 94.9° |

Details

ξ UMa Aa
| Mass | 0.97 M_{☉} |
| Radius | 1.02±0.04 R_{☉} |
| Luminosity | 1.21 L_{☉} |
| Surface gravity (log g) | 4.39±0.10 cgs |
| Temperature | 6,005±80 K |
| Rotational velocity (v sin i) | 1.0±1.0 km/s |

ξ UMa Ab
| Mass | 0.38±0.02 M_{☉} |
| Radius | 0.32 R_{☉} |
| Temperature | ~3,700 (Note: This estimate assumes that ξ UMa Ab is a red dwarf.) K |

ξ UMa Ba
| Mass | 0.86 M_{☉} |
| Radius | 0.92±0.04 R_{☉} |
| Luminosity | 0.79 L_{☉} |
| Surface gravity (log g) | 4.46±0.10 cgs |
| Temperature | 5,692±90 K |
| Metallicity [Fe/H] | −0.35±0.08 dex |
| Rotational velocity (v sin i) | 3.0±1.0 km/s |

ξ UMa Bb
| Mass | 0.14+0.05 −0.09 M_{☉} |

Other designations
- Alula Australis, ξ Ursae Majoris, ξ UMa, Xi UMa, 53 Ursae Majoris, BD+32°2132, GC 15537, GJ 423, HIP 55203, SAO 62484, CCDM J11182+3132, WDS J11182+3132
- A: HD 98231, HR 4375
- B: HD 98230, HR 4374
- E: WISE J111838.70+312537.9

Database references
| SIMBAD | ξ UMa |
- ξ UMa AB
- ξ UMa A
- ξ UMa B
- ξ UMa Bb
- WISE J1118+3125

Xi Ursae Majoris is a quintuple star system 28.5 light-years (8.7 parsecs) away in the constellation of Ursa Major. It has the traditional name Alula Australis; Xi Ursae Majoris is the Bayer designation, which is Latinised from ξ Ursae Majoris and abbreviated Xi UMa or ξ UMa. It is a variable star with a small amplitude. Xi Ursae Majoris is found in the left hind paw of the Great Bear.

Xi Ursae Majoris is the second-nearest quintuple system, after V1054 Ophiuchi.

== History of observations ==
Xi Ursae Majoris was found to be a visual double star by William Herschel in 1780, and in 1804 he presented it as a likely physical binary star based on observed orbital motion. It then became the first visual double star for which an orbit was calculated, when it was computed by Félix Savary in 1828.

== Stellar system ==
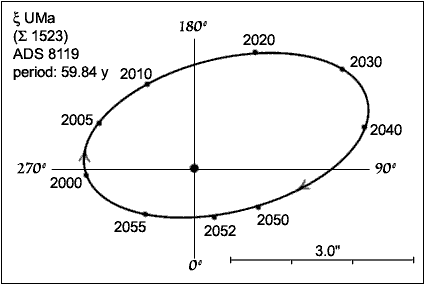
Orbit of Xi Ursae Majoris

The two main components are yellow main-sequence stars. The brighter component (designated Xi Ursae Majoris A), has a mean apparent magnitude of +4.41. The companion star (Xi Ursae Majoris B) has an apparent magnitude of +4.87. The orbital period of the two stars is 59.84 years. They are currently (2022) separated by 2.3 arcseconds, and will widen to a maximum 3.0 arcseconds in 2035.

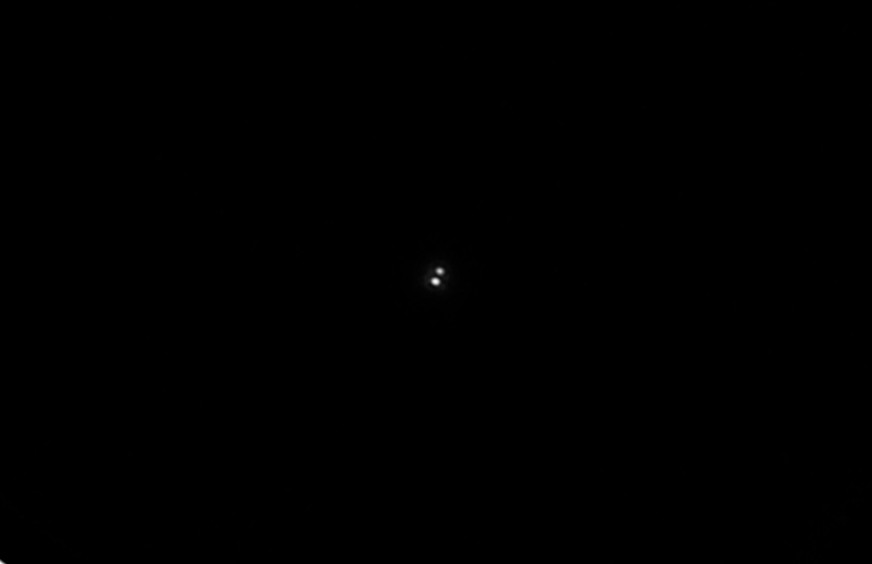
Double star Xi Ursae Majoris.(θ):156.6° (ρ):2.1 arc"

Each component of this double star is itself a single-lined spectroscopic binary. The orbit of the A pair has been determined from spectroscopy and speckle interferometry, giving a period of 669 days and an eccentricity of 0.53. B's binary companion (Xi Ursae Majoris Bb) has not been detected visually, but the radial velocity variations of the spectral lines show a circular orbit with a period of 3.98 days. The masses of both A and B's companions (Ab and Bb) (deduced by the sum total mass of the system minus the likely masses of Aa and Ba determined by their class) indicate that they are probably red dwarfs, Bb being on the cool end of the M spectrum, not much hotter than a brown dwarf. However, component Ba has been found to be enriched in barium relative to component Aa, suggesting that its companion Bb may be a white dwarf.

In 2012 Wright et al. discovered the fifth component and the first brown dwarf of the system using Wide-field Infrared Survey Explorer (WISE) data—a T8.5 brown dwarf WISE J111838.70+312537.9 with angular separation 8.5 arcmin, and the projected physical separation about 4,000 AU.

== Variable star ==
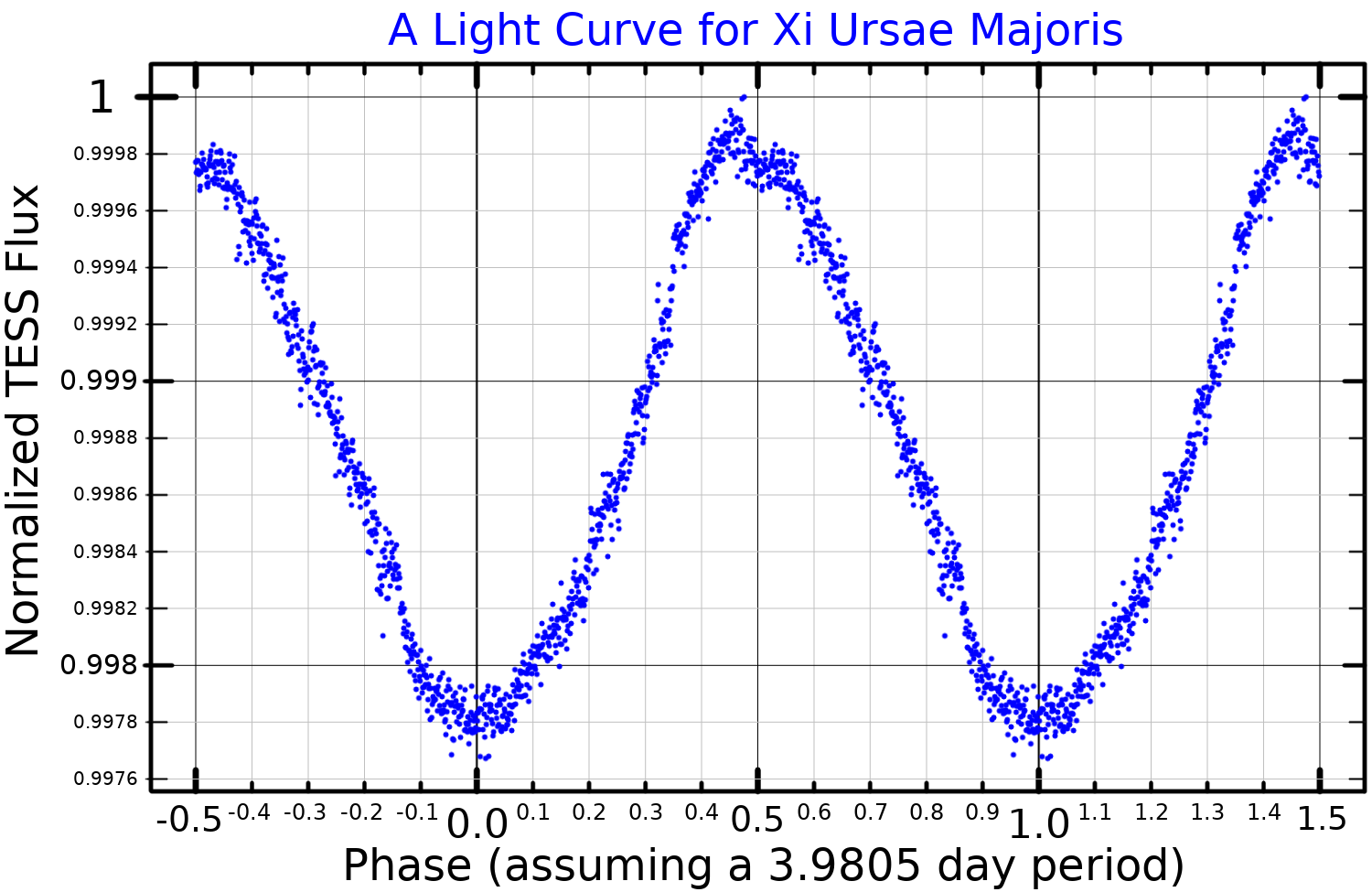
A light curve for Xi Ursae Majoris, plotted from TESS data

ξ Ursae Majoris is classified as an RS Canum Venaticorum variable and its brightness varies by 0.01 magnitude. Component B is believed to be the variable star, showing characteristic emission lines in its spectrum that are not present for component A.

== Nomenclature ==
ξ Ursae Majoris (Latinised to Xi Ursae Majoris) is the star's Bayer designation.

It also bore the traditional names Alula Australis (and erroneously Alula Australe). Alula (shared with Nu Ursae Majoris) comes from the Arabic phrase Al Ḳafzah al Ūla 'the First Spring' and Australis is Latin for 'southern'. In 2016, the International Astronomical Union organized a Working Group on Star Names (WGSN) to catalog and standardize proper names for stars. The WGSN's first bulletin of July 2016 included a table of the first two batches of names approved by the WGSN; which included Alula Australis for Xi Ursae Majoris Aa.

In Chinese, 三台 (Sān Tái), meaning Three Steps, refers to an asterism consisting of Xi Ursae Majoris, Iota Ursae Majoris, Kappa Ursae Majoris, Lambda Ursae Majoris, Mu Ursae Majoris and Nu Ursae Majoris. Consequently, the Chinese name for Xi Ursae Majoris itself is 下台二 (Xià Tái èr, English: Star of Second Lower Step).

== See also ==
- List of star systems within 25–30 light-years
