= Mu Ursae Majoris =

Binary star in the constellation Ursa Major

- Location of μ Ursae Majoris (circled)

Observation data Epoch J2000 Equinox ICRS
- Constellation: Ursa Major
- Right ascension: 10^{h} 22^{m} 19.73976^{s}
- Declination: +41° 29′ 58.2691″
- Apparent magnitude (V): +3.06

Characteristics
- Evolutionary stage: AGB
- Spectral type: M0 IIIab
- U−B color index: +1.90
- B−V color index: +1.59
- Variable type: suspected

Astrometry
Radial velocity (R_{v})	−21.30±1.66 km/s
Proper motion (μ)	RA: –81.47 mas/yr Dec.: +35.34 mas/yr
Parallax (π)	14.16±0.54 mas
Distance	230 ± 9 ly (71 ± 3 pc)
Absolute magnitude (M_{V})	−1.11±0.083

Orbit
Period (P)	230.089 days
Semi-major axis (a)	0.0028″
Eccentricity (e)	0.061
Inclination (i)	13.6°
Periastron epoch (T)	2425577.030 JD
Argument of periastron (ω) (secondary)	236.4°
Semi-amplitude (K_{1}) (primary)	7.40 km/s

Details

μ UMa A
Mass	6.3 M_{☉}
Radius	75 R_{☉}
Luminosity	977–1,200 L_{☉}
Surface gravity (log g)	1.0 cgs
Temperature	3,899 K
Metallicity [Fe/H]	+0.00 dex
Rotational velocity (v sin i)	7.5 km/s

μ UMa B
Mass	0.96 M_{☉}

Other designations
- Tania Australis, Alkafzah al Thaniyah, μ Ursae Majoris, μ UMa, Mu UMa, 34 Ursae Majoris, BD+42 2115, FK5 386, GC 14232, HD 89758, HIP 50801, HR 4069, PPM 51850, SAO 43310

Database references
SIMBAD	data

Mu Ursae Majoris is a binary star in the constellation of Ursa Major, and possibly part of a triple star system. It has the proper name Tania Australis /ˈteɪniə ɔːˈstreɪlɪs/, Mu Ursae Majoris is its Bayer designation. An apparent visual magnitude of +3.06 places it among the brighter members of the constellation. Parallax measurements give a distance measurement of roughly 230 light-years (71 parsecs), with a margin of error of 4%.

== Stellar system ==
Mu Ursae Majoris is an evolved star that is currently in the red giant stage with a stellar classification of M0 IIIab. It has expanded to 75 times the radius of the Sun whilst the outer atmosphere has cooled to an effective temperature of 3,899 K, giving it the orange-red hued glow of an M-type star. Estimates of the luminosity range from 977–1,200 times that of the Sun. It is classified as a suspected variable star with a brightness variation from magnitude 2.99^{m} to 3.33^{m}.

This is a spectroscopic binary star system with a companion a mere 0.2 AU from the primary, with an orbital period of 230 days.

In addition to the inner pair, a proper motion companion has a 99% chance to be related to this system. It has a very low mass of just 0.1 solar masses, and a projected separation of 3,900 astronomical units.

== Nomenclature ==
μ Ursae Majoris (Latinised to Mu Ursae Majoris) is the star's Bayer designation. It can be abbreviated to abbreviated Mu UMa or μ UMa.

It bore the traditional names Tania (shared with Lambda Ursae Majoris) and Tania Australis. Tania comes from the Arabic phrase Al Fiḳrah al Thānia 'the Second Spring (of the Gazelle)'. and Australis (originally australis) is Latin for 'the south side'. In 2016, the International Astronomical Union organized a Working Group on Star Names (WGSN) to catalog and standardize proper names for stars. The WGSN's first bulletin of July 2016 included a table of the first two batches of names approved by the WGSN; which included Tania Australis for Mu Ursae Majoris A.

In Chinese, 三台 (Sān Tái), meaning Three Steps, refers to an asterism consisting of Mu Ursae Majoris, Iota Ursae Majoris, Kappa Ursae Majoris, Lambda Ursae Majoris, Nu Ursae Majoris and Xi Ursae Majoris. Consequently, the Chinese name for Mu Ursae Majoris itself is 中台二 (Zhōng Tái èr, English: Star of Second Middle Step).
