= Kappa Ursae Majoris =

Binary star in the constellation Ursa Major

- Location of κ Ursae Majoris (circled)

Observation data Epoch J2000.0 Equinox ICRS
- Constellation: Ursa Major
- Right ascension: 09^{h} 03^{m} 37.52762^{s}
- Declination: +47° 09′ 23.4890″
- Apparent magnitude (V): 3.56 (4.16 + 4.54)

Characteristics
- Spectral type: A0 IV-V + A0 V

Astrometry
Proper motion (μ)	RA: −36.19 mas/yr Dec.: −55.40 mas/yr
Parallax (π)	9.10±0.50 mas
Distance	360 ± 20 ly (110 ± 6 pc)
Absolute magnitude (M_{V})	−1.63

Orbit
Period (P)	13,007.2±9.7 d
Semi-major axis (a)	0.18194 ± 0.00025″
Eccentricity (e)	0.5584±0.0015
Inclination (i)	109.410±0.066°
Longitude of the node (Ω)	105.641±0.080°
Periastron epoch (T)	50404 ± 12
Argument of periastron (ω) (secondary)	355.63±0.36°

Details

κ UMa A
Mass	3.79±0.12 M_{☉}
Radius	7.87 R_{☉}
Temperature	9,060 K
Rotational velocity (v sin i)	201 km/s

Other designations
- Alkaphrah, κ UMa, 12 Ursae Majoris, BD+47°1633, FK5 341, GC 12503, HD 77327, HIP 44471, HR 3594, SAO 42661, PPM 50987, CCDM J09036+4709AB, WDS J09036+4709AB

Database references
SIMBAD	data

Kappa Ursae Majoris (κ Ursae Majoris, abbreviated Kappa UMa, κ UMa) is a binary star in the constellation of Ursa Major. With a combined apparent magnitude of +3.60, the system is approximately 358 light-years from Earth.

The two components are designated Kappa Ursae Majoris A (officially named Alkaphrah /ælˈkæfrə/, a traditional name of the system) and B.

== Nomenclature ==
κ Ursae Majoris (Latinised to Kappa Ursae Majoris) is the system's Bayer designation. The designations of the two components as Kappa Ursae Majoris A and B derives from the convention used by the Washington Multiplicity Catalog (WMC) for multiple star systems, and adopted by the International Astronomical Union (IAU).

A traditional name of the system is Alkafzah (corrupted to Alkaphrah or El Koprah), from the Arabic القفزة al-qafzah "the leap [of the gazelle]", which refers to an asterism consisting of ι, κ, λ, μ, ν, and ξ Ursae Majoris. The name Alkafzah (and variants) was also (mis)attributed to χ Ursae Majoris. κ and ι Ursae Majoris formed the third leap of the gazelle, and sometimes shared the name Talitha, from Arabic al-thālitha "third", with κ rarely called Talitha Australis, "southern Talitha" in Latin.

In 2016, the IAU organized a Working Group on Star Names (WGSN) to catalog and standardize proper names for stars. The WGSN decided to attribute proper names to individual stars rather than entire multiple systems. It approved the name Alkaphrah for the component Kappa Ursae Majoris A on 5 September 2017 and it is now so included in the List of IAU-approved Star Names. The name Talitha was approved for ι Ursae Majoris Aa.

In Chinese astronomy, 三台 (Sān Tái), meaning Three Steps, refers to an asterism consisting of Kappa Ursae Majoris, Iota Ursae Majoris, Lambda Ursae Majoris, Mu Ursae Majoris, Nu Ursae Majoris and Xi Ursae Majoris. Consequently, the Chinese name for Kappa Ursae Majoris itself is 上台二 (Shàng Tái èr, English: Star of Second Upper Step).

== Properties ==
Both components of the binary star are white A-type main sequence dwarfs. They have apparent magnitudes of +4.2 and +4.5. The orbital period of the binary is 35.6 years (13,007.2 days), and the two stars are separated by 0.18 arcseconds. An infrared excess indicates a debris disk with a mean temperature of 165 K is orbiting the primary at a separation of 55.2 AU.
