= Ursa Major =

Constellation in the northern sky

- Constellation
- List of stars in Ursa Major
- Abbreviation: UMa
- Genitive: Ursae Majoris
- Pronunciation: /ˌɜːrsə ˈmeɪdʒər/ UR-sə MAY-jər, genitive /ˌɜːrsiː məˈdʒɔːrɪs/ UR-see mə-JOR-iss
- Symbolism: the Great Bear
- Right ascension: 10.67^{h}
- Declination: +55.38°
- Quadrant: NQ2
- Area: 1280 sq. deg. (3rd)
- Main stars: 7, 20
- Bayer/Flamsteed stars: 93
- Stars with planets: 21
- Stars brighter than 3.00^{m}: 7
- Stars within 10.00 pc (32.62 ly): 8
- Brightest star: Alioth (ε UMa) (1.76^{m})
- Nearest star: Lalande 21185
- Messier objects: 7
- Meteor showers: Alpha Ursae Majorids; Kappa Ursae Majorids; October Ursae Majorids
- Bordering constellations: Draco; Camelopardalis; Lynx; Leo Minor; Leo; Coma Berenices; Canes Venatici; Boötes
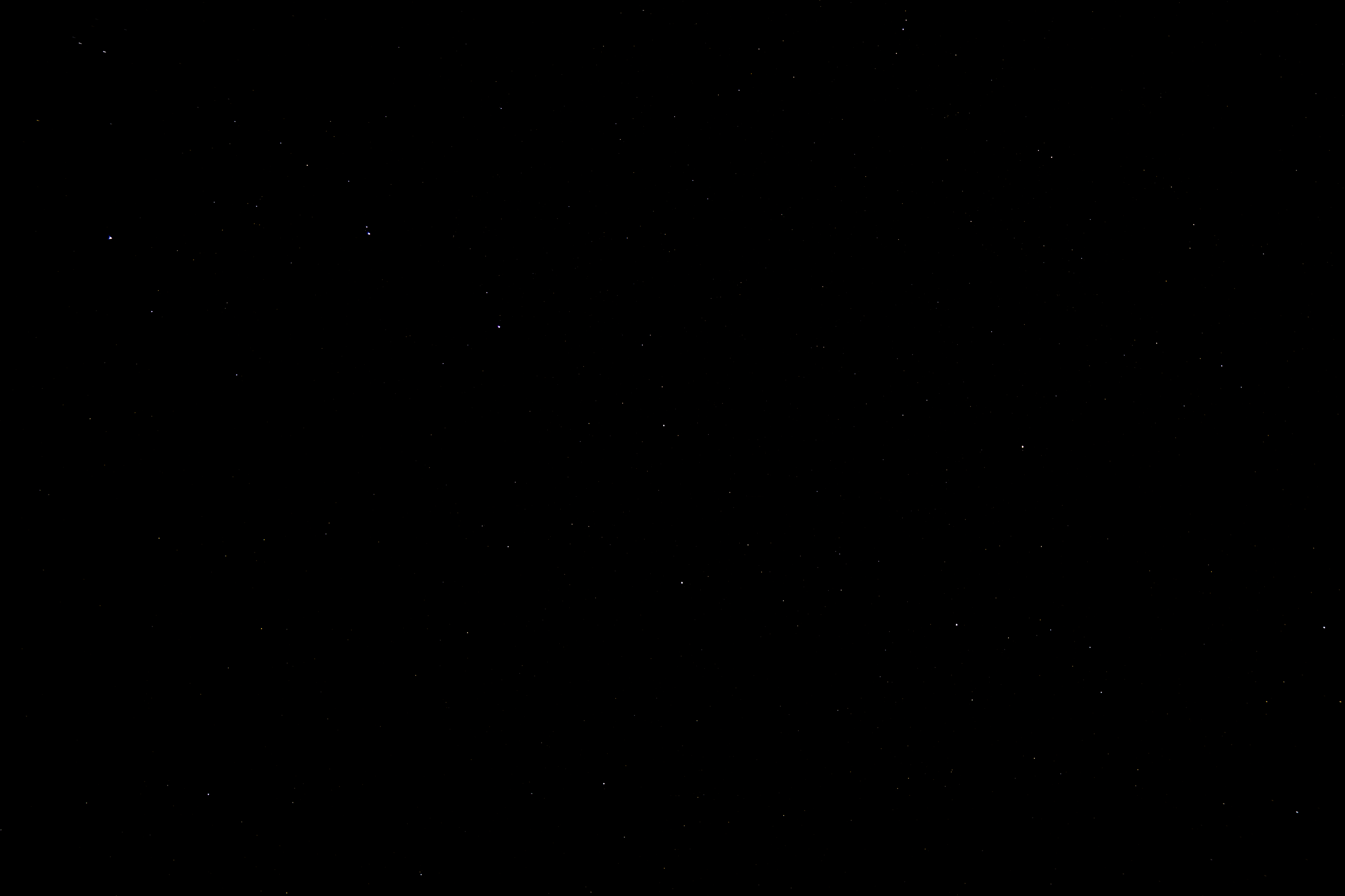
- Visible at latitudes between +90° and −30°. Best visible at 21:00 (9 p.m.) during the month of April. The Big Dipper or Plough

Ursa Major, also known as the Great Bear, is a constellation in the Northern Sky, whose associated mythology likely dates back into prehistory. Its Latin name means "greater (or larger) bear", referring to and contrasting it with nearby Ursa Minor, the lesser bear. In antiquity, it was one of the original 48 constellations listed by Ptolemy in the 2nd century AD, drawing on earlier works by Greek, Egyptian, Babylonian, and Assyrian astronomers. It is the third largest of the 88 modern constellations.

Ursa Major is primarily known from the asterism of its main seven stars, which has been called the "Big Dipper", "the Wagon", "Charles's Wain", or "the Plough", among other names. In particular, the Big Dipper's stellar configuration mimics the shape of the "Little Dipper". Two of its stars, Dubhe and Merak (α Ursae Majoris and β Ursae Majoris), can be used as pointers to the northern pole star, Polaris, in Ursa Minor.

Ursa Major, along with asterisms it contains or overlaps, is significant to numerous world cultures, often as a symbol of the north. Its depiction on the flag of Alaska is a modern example of such symbolism.

Ursa Major is visible throughout the year from most of the Northern Hemisphere, and appears circumpolar above the mid-northern latitudes. From southern temperate latitudes, the main asterism is invisible, but the southern parts of the constellation can still be viewed.

== Characteristics ==
Ursa Major covers 1279.7 square degrees or 3.102% of the total sky, making it the third largest constellation. In 1930, Eugène Delporte set its official International Astronomical Union (IAU) constellation boundaries, defining it as a 28-sided irregular polygon. In the equatorial coordinate system, the constellation stretches between the right ascension coordinates of 08^{h} 08.3^{m} and 14^{h} 29.0^{m} and the declination coordinates of +28.30° and +73.14°.

Ursa Major borders eight other constellations: Draco to the north and northeast, Boötes to the east, Canes Venatici to the east and southeast, Coma Berenices to the southeast, Leo and Leo Minor to the south, Lynx to the southwest and Camelopardalis to the northwest. The three-letter constellation abbreviation "UMa" was adopted by the IAU in 1922.

== Features ==
=== Asterisms ===
Ursa Major and Polaris with names of bright stars in the Big Dipper

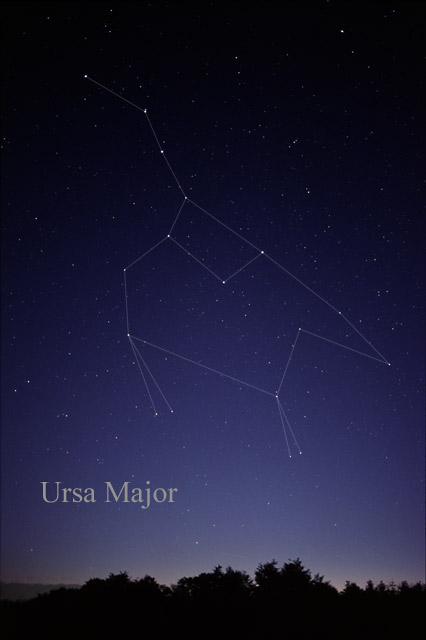
The constellation Ursa Major as it can be seen by the unaided eye

The constellation Ursa Major showing the IAU boundaries, the constellation stick figure, and labels for its brightest stars. Astrophotograph by Eckhard Slawik, from NOIRLab's 88 Constellations project.

The outline of the seven bright stars of Ursa Major form the asterism known as the "Big Dipper" in the United States and Canada, while in the United Kingdom it is called the Plough or (historically) Charles' Wain. Six of the seven stars are of second magnitude or higher, and it forms one of the best-known patterns in the sky. As many of its common names allude, its shape is said to resemble a ladle, an agricultural plough, or wagon. In the context of Ursa Major, they are commonly drawn to represent the hindquarters and tail of the Great Bear. Starting with the "ladle" portion of the dipper and extending clockwise (eastward in the sky) through the handle, these stars are the following:

- Dubhe ("the bear"), which at a magnitude of 1.79 is the 35th-brightest star in the sky and the second-brightest of Ursa Major.
- Merak ("the loins of the bear"), with a magnitude of 2.37.
- Phecda ("thigh"), with a magnitude of 2.44.
- Megrez, meaning "root of the tail", referring to its location as the intersection of the body and tail of the bear (or the ladle and handle of the dipper).
- Alioth, a name which refers not to a bear but to a "black horse", the name corrupted from the original and mis-assigned to the similarly named Alcor, the naked-eye binary companion of Mizar. Alioth is the brightest star of Ursa Major and the 33rd-brightest in the sky, with a magnitude of 1.76. It is also the brightest of the chemically peculiar Ap stars, magnetic stars whose chemical elements are either depleted or enhanced, and appear to change as the star rotates.
- Mizar, ζ Ursae Majoris, the second star in from the end of the handle of the Big Dipper, and the constellation's fourth-brightest star. Mizar, which means "girdle", forms a famous double star, with its optical companion Alcor (80 Ursae Majoris), the two of which were termed the "horse and rider" by the Arabs.
- Alkaid, known as η Ursae Majoris, is situated at the end of the tail. With a magnitude of 1.85, Alkaid is the third-brightest star of Ursa Major.

Except for Dubhe and Alkaid, the stars of the Big Dipper all have proper motions heading toward a common point in Sagittarius. A few other such stars have been identified, and together they are called the Ursa Major Moving Group.

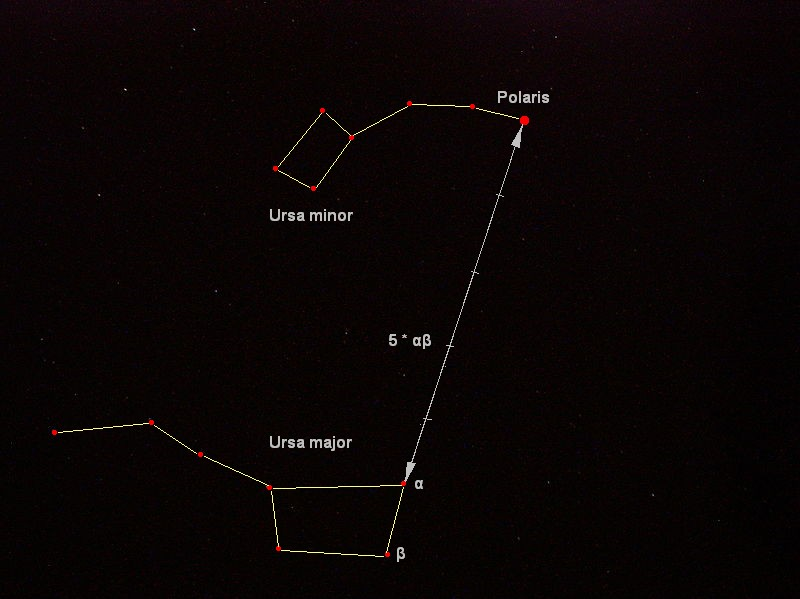
Ursa Major and Ursa Minor in relation to Polaris

The stars Merak (β Ursae Majoris) and Dubhe (α Ursae Majoris) are known as the "pointer stars" because they are helpful for finding Polaris, also known as the North Star or Pole Star. By visually tracing a line from Merak through Dubhe (1 unit) and continuing for 5 units, one's eye will land on Polaris, accurately indicating true north.

Another asterism is recognized in Arab culture as representing three pairs of footprints of a leaping gazelle. It is a series of three pairs of stars found along the southern border of the constellation. From southeast to southwest, the "first leap", comprising ν and ξ Ursae Majoris (Alula Borealis and Australis, respectively); the "second leap", comprising λ and μ Ursae Majoris (Tania Borealis and Australis); and the "third leap", comprising ι and κ Ursae Majoris (Talitha and Alkaphrah). The same asterism has the Chinese name Santai and the Indian name Trivikrama, both meaning "three steps".

=== Other stars ===
W Ursae Majoris is the prototype of a class of contact binary variable stars, and ranges between magnitudes 7.75 and 8.48.

47 Ursae Majoris is a Sun-like star with a three-planet system. 47 Ursae Majoris b, discovered in 1996, orbits every 1078 days and is 2.53 times the mass of Jupiter. 47 Ursae Majoris c, discovered in 2001, orbits every 2391 days and is 0.54 times the mass of Jupiter. 47 Ursae Majoris d, discovered in 2010, has an uncertain period, lying between 8907 and 19097 days; it is 1.64 times the mass of Jupiter. The star is of magnitude 5.0 and is approximately 46 light-years from Earth.

The star TYC 3429-697-1 (9^{h} 40^{m} 44^{s} 48° 14′ 2″), located to the east of θ Ursae Majoris and to the southwest of the "Big Dipper", has been recognized as the state star of Delaware, and is informally known as the Delaware Diamond.

=== Deep-sky objects ===
The Pinwheel Galaxy

Several bright galaxies are found in Ursa Major, including the pair Messier 81 (one of the brightest galaxies in the sky) and Messier 82 above the bear's head, and Pinwheel Galaxy (M101), a spiral northeast of Alkaid. The spiral galaxies Messier 108 and Messier 109 are also found in this constellation. The bright planetary nebula Owl Nebula (M97) can be found along the bottom of the bowl of the Big Dipper.

M81 is a nearly face-on spiral galaxy 11.8 million light-years from Earth. Like most spiral galaxies, it has a core made up of old stars, with arms filled with young stars and nebulae. Along with M82, it is a part of the galaxy cluster closest to the Local Group.

M82 is a nearly edgewise galaxy that is interacting gravitationally with M81. It is the brightest infrared galaxy in the sky. SN 2014J, an apparent Type Ia supernova, was observed in M82 on 21 January 2014.

M97, also called the Owl Nebula, is a planetary nebula 1,630 light-years from Earth; it has a magnitude of approximately 10. It was discovered in 1781 by Pierre Méchain.

M101, also called the Pinwheel Galaxy, is a face-on spiral galaxy located 25 million light-years from Earth. It was discovered by Pierre Méchain in 1781. Its spiral arms have regions with extensive star formation and have strong ultraviolet emissions. It has an integrated magnitude of 7.5, making it visible in both binoculars and telescopes, but not to the naked eye.

NGC 2787 is a lenticular galaxy at a distance of 24 million light-years. Unlike most lenticular galaxies, NGC 2787 has a bar at its center. It also has a halo of globular clusters, indicating its age and relative stability.

NGC 2950 is a lenticular galaxy located 60 million light-years from Earth.

NGC 3000 is a double star, and catalogued as a nebula-type object.

NGC 3079 is a starburst spiral galaxy located 52 million light-years from Earth. It has a horseshoe-shaped structure at its center that indicates the presence of a supermassive black hole. The structure itself is formed by superwinds from the black hole.

NGC 3310 is another starburst spiral galaxy located 50 million light-years from Earth. Its bright white color is caused by its higher than usual rate of star formation, which began 100 million years ago after a merger. Studies of this and other starburst galaxies have shown that their starburst phase can last for hundreds of millions of years, far longer than was previously assumed.

NGC 4013 is an edge-on spiral galaxy located 55 million light-years from Earth. It has a prominent dust lane and has several visible star forming regions.

I Zwicky 18 is a dwarf galaxy at a distance of 45 million light-years. Due to its very low metallicity and Helium content, once it was thought that it is the youngest-known galaxy in the visible universe. Today, thanks to the researches performed with Hubble Space Telescope, it is clear that IZW18 contains star aged more than 13 billion years.

The Hubble Deep Field is located to the northeast of δ Ursae Majoris.

=== Meteor showers ===
- The Alpha Ursae Majorids are a minor meteor shower in the constellation. They may be caused by the comet C/1992 W1 (Ohshita).
- The Kappa Ursae Majorids are a newly discovered meteor shower, peaking between November 1 and November 10.
- The October Ursae Majorids were discovered in 2006 by Japanese researchers. They may be caused may be a long period comet. The shower peaks between October 12 and 19.

=== Extrasolar planets ===
HD 80606, a sun-like star in a binary system, orbits a common center of gravity with its partner, HD 80607; the two are separated by 1,200 AU on average. Research conducted in 2003 indicates that its sole planet, HD 80606 b is a future hot Jupiter, modeled to have evolved in a perpendicular orbit around 5 AU from its sun. The 4-Jupiter mass planet is projected to eventually move into a circular, more aligned orbit via the Kozai mechanism. However, it is currently on an incredibly eccentric orbit that ranges from approximately one astronomical unit at its apoapsis and six stellar radii at periapsis.

== History ==
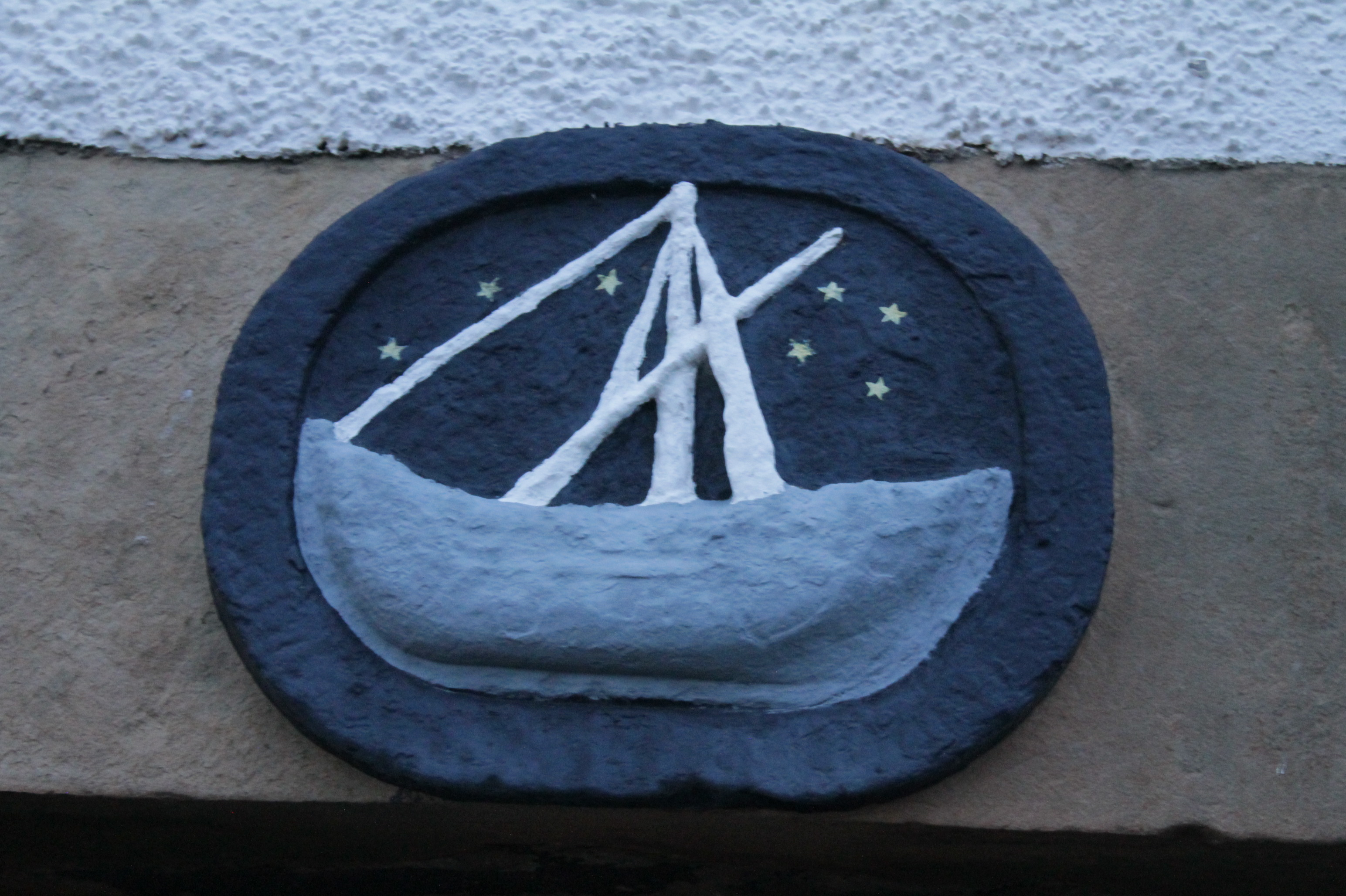
Ursa Major shown on a carved stone, c. 1700, Crail, Fife, Scotland

Ursa Major has been reconstructed as an Indo-European constellation. It was one of the 48 constellations listed by the 2nd century AD astronomer Ptolemy in his Almagest, who called it Arktos Megale. (Note: Ptolemy named the constellation in Greek Ἄρκτος μεγάλη (Arktos Megale) or the great bear. Ursa Minor was Arktos Mikra)

== Mythology ==
The constellation of Ursa Major has been seen as a bear, usually female, by multiple connected civilizations. This may stem from a common oral tradition of Cosmic Hunt myths stretching back more than 13,000 years. Using statistical and phylogenetic tools, Julien d'Huy reconstructs the following Palaeolithic state of the story: "There is an animal that is a horned herbivore, especially an elk. One human pursues this ungulate. The hunt locates or get to the sky. The animal is alive when it is transformed into a constellation. It forms the Big Dipper."

=== Arabian folklore ===
Whilst the Pre-Islamic Arabs recognised the larger constellation of Ursa Major as being a bear, perhaps due to Greek influence, they had traditionally always recognised the Big Dipper and Ursa Minor as being counterparts. Both were imagined as funeral processions with the ladle of either seen as a funerary bier and its handle as a train of mourners. The Big Dipper is known as banāt an-na'sh al-kubrā meaning literally "the greater daughters of the bier". However daughters here means those pertaining to it, i.e. the mourners and thus is better translated as "the greater funeral procession", whilst Ursa Minor is known as "the lesser funeral procession". There is also a legend that the body on the bier is the father of those following behind it, a man called Na'ash who was murdered by Al-judayy (the Arabic name for the North Star) and whom the funeral procession is in pursuit of.

=== Greco-Roman tradition ===
In Greek mythology, Zeus (the king of the gods, known as Jupiter in Roman mythology) lusts after a young woman named Callisto, a nymph of Artemis (known to the Romans as Diana). Zeus's jealous wife Hera (Juno to the Romans) discovers that Callisto has a son named Arcas as the result of her rape by Zeus and transforms Callisto into a bear as a punishment. Callisto, while in bear form, later encounters her son Arcas. Arcas almost spears the bear, but to avert the tragedy Zeus whisks them both into the sky, Callisto as Ursa Major and Arcas as the constellation Boötes. Ovid called Ursa Major the Parrhasian Bear, since Callisto came from Parrhasia in Arcadia, where the story is set.

The Greek poet Aratus called the constellation Helike, ("turning" or "twisting"), because it turns around the celestial pole. The Odyssey notes that it is the sole constellation that never sinks below the horizon and "bathes in the Ocean's waves", so it is used as a celestial reference point for navigation. It has also been called the "Wain" or "Plaustrum", a Latin word referring to a ‍horse-drawn ‍cart.

=== Hindu tradition ===
In Hinduism fact that the two front stars of the constellations point to the pole star is explained as the boon given to the boy sage Dhruva by Vishnu..

=== In Judaism and Christianity ===
Ursa Major may be mentioned in the biblical book of Job (Job 9:9), dated between the 7th and 4th centuries BC, although this is often disputed.

=== East Asian traditions ===
In China and Japan, the Big Dipper is called the "North Dipper" 北斗 (Chinese: běidǒu, Japanese: hokuto), and in ancient times, each one of the seven stars had a specific name, often coming themselves from ancient China:

- "Pivot" 樞 (C: shū J: sū) is for Dubhe (Alpha Ursae Majoris)
- "Beautiful jade" 璇 (C: xuán J: sen) is for Merak (Beta Ursae Majoris)
- "Pearl" 璣 (C: jī J: ki) is for Phecda (Gamma Ursae Majoris)
- "Balance" 權 (C: quán J: ken) is for Megrez (Delta Ursae Majoris)
- "Measuring rod of jade" 玉衡 (C: yùhéng J: gyokkō) is for Alioth (Epsilon Ursae Majoris)
- "Opening of the Yang" 開陽 (C: kāiyáng J: kaiyō) is for Mizar (Zeta Ursae Majoris)
- Alkaid (Eta Ursae Majoris) has several nicknames: "Sword" 劍 (C: jiàn J: ken) (short form from "End of the sword" 劍先 (C: jiàn xiān J: ken saki)), "Flickering light" 搖光 (C: yáoguāng J: yōkō), or again "Star of military defeat" 破軍星 (C: pójūn xīng J: hagun sei), because travel in the direction of this star was regarded as bad luck for an army.

In Shinto, the seven largest stars of Ursa Major belong to Ame-no-Minakanushi, the oldest and most powerful of all kami.

In South Korea, the constellation is referred to as "the seven stars of the north". In the related myth, a widow with seven sons found comfort with a widower, but to get to his house required crossing a stream. The seven sons, sympathetic to their mother, placed stepping stones in the river. Their mother, not knowing who put the stones in place, blessed them and, when they died, they became the constellation.

=== Native American traditions ===
The Haudenosaunee interpreted Alioth, Mizar, and Alkaid as three hunters pursuing the Great Bear (Seneca: nyagwai’ hadíshe’ transl. they're chasing a bear). According to one version of their myth, the first hunter (Alioth) is carrying a bow and arrow to strike down the bear. The second hunter (Mizar) carries a large pot – the star Alcor – on his shoulder in which to cook the bear while the third hunter (Alkaid) hauls a pile of firewood to light a fire beneath the pot.

The Lakota people call the constellation Wičhákhiyuhapi, or "Great Bear".

The Wampanoag people (Algonquian) referred to Ursa Major as "maske", meaning "bear" according to Thomas Morton in The New England Canaan.

The Wasco-Wishram Native Americans interpreted the constellation as five wolves and two bears that were left in the sky by Coyote.

=== Germanic traditions ===
To Norse pagans, the Big Dipper was known as Óðins vagn, "Woden's wagon". Likewise Woden is poetically referred to by Kennings such as vagna verr 'guardian of the wagon' or vagna rúni 'confidant of the wagon'

=== Uralic traditions ===
In the Finnish language, the asterism is sometimes called by its old Finnish name, Otava. The meaning of the name has been almost forgotten in Modern Finnish; it means a salmon weir. Ancient Finns believed the bear (Ursus arctos) was lowered to earth in a golden basket off the Ursa Major, and when a bear was killed, its head was positioned on a tree to allow the bear's spirit to return to Ursa Major.

In the Sámi languages of Northern Europe, part of the constellation (i.e. the Big Dipper minus Dubhe and Merak, is identified as the bow of the great hunter Fávdna (the star Arcturus). In the main Sámi language, North Sámi, it is called Fávdnadávgi ("Fávdna's Bow") or simply dávggát ("the Bow"). The constellation features prominently in the Sámi anthem, which begins with the words Guhkkin davvin dávggaid vuolde sabmá suolggai Sámieanan, which translates to "Far to the north, under the Bow, the Land of the Sámi slowly comes into view." The Bow is an important part of the Sámi traditional narrative about the night sky, in which various hunters try to chase down Sarva, the Great Reindeer, a large constellation that takes up almost half the sky. According to the legend, Fávdna stands ready to fire his Bow every night but hesitates because he might hit Stella Polaris, known as Boahji ("the Rivet"), which would cause the sky to collapse and end the world.

=== Southeast Asian traditions ===
In Burmese, Pucwan Tārā (ပုဇွန် တာရာ, [bəzʊ̀ɴ tàjà]) is the name of a constellation comprising stars from the head and forelegs of Ursa Major; pucwan (ပုဇွန်) is a general term for a crustacean, such as prawn, shrimp, crab, lobster, etc.

In Javanese, it is known as "lintang jong", which means "the jong constellation". Likewise, in Malay it is called "bintang jong".

=== Esoteric lore ===
In Theosophy, it is believed that the Seven Stars of the Pleiades focus the spiritual energy of the seven rays from the Galactic Logos to the Seven Stars of the Great Bear, then to Sirius, then to the Sun, then to the god of Earth (Sanat Kumara), and finally through the seven Masters of the Seven Rays to the human race.

== In culture ==
Ursa Major is mentioned by such poets as Homer, Spenser, Shakespeare, Tennyson and also by Federico Garcia Lorca, in "Ballad of the Moon". Ancient Finnish poetry also refers to the constellation, and it features in the painting Starry Night Over the Rhône by Vincent van Gogh.

The song Follow the Drinkin' Gourd refers to the Big Dipper.

== Graphic visualisation ==
In European star charts, the constellation was visualized with the 'square' of the Big Dipper forming the bear's body and the chain of stars forming the Dipper's "handle" as a long tail. However, bears do not have long tails, and Jewish astronomers considered Alioth, Mizar, and Alkaid instead to be three cubs following their mother, while the Native Americans saw them as three hunters.

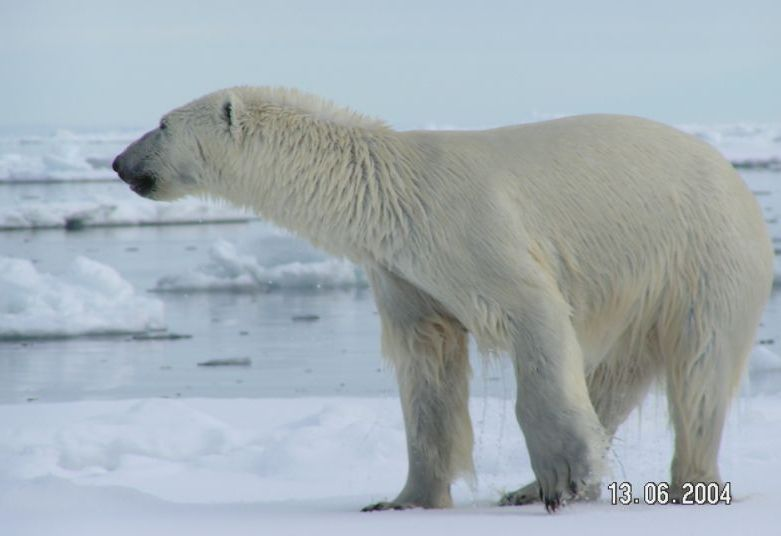
H. A. Rey's alternative asterism for Ursa Major can be said to give it the longer head and neck of a polar bear, as seen in this photo, from the left side.

Noted children's book author H. A. Rey, in his 1952 book The Stars: A New Way to See Them, (ISBN 0-395-24830-2) had a different asterism in mind for Ursa Major, that instead had the "bear" image of the constellation oriented with Alkaid as the tip of the bear's nose, and the "handle" of the Big Dipper part of the constellation forming the outline of the top of the bear's head and neck, rearwards to the shoulder, potentially giving it the longer head and neck of a polar bear.

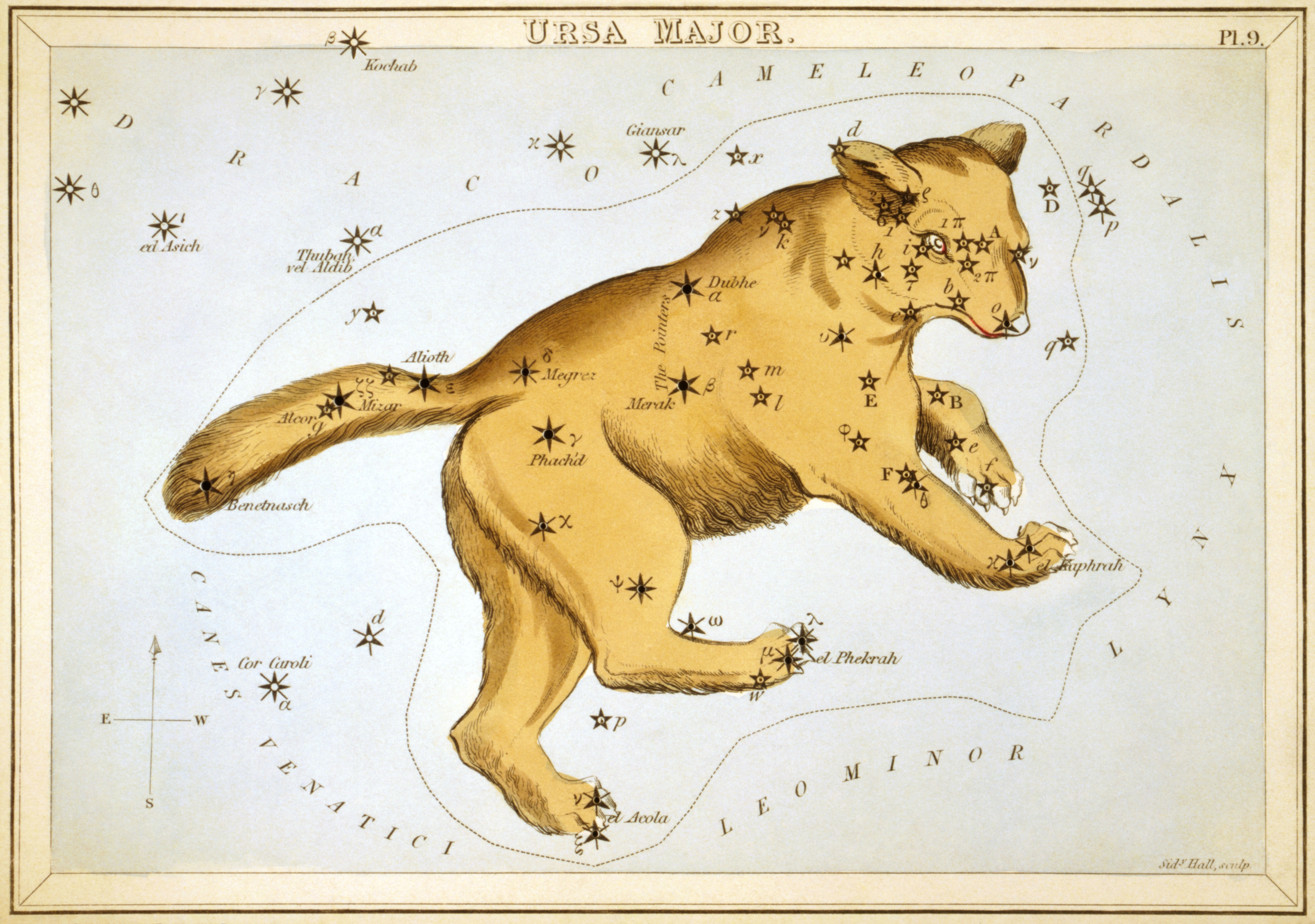
Ursa Major as depicted in Urania's Mirror, a set of constellation cards published in London c.1825

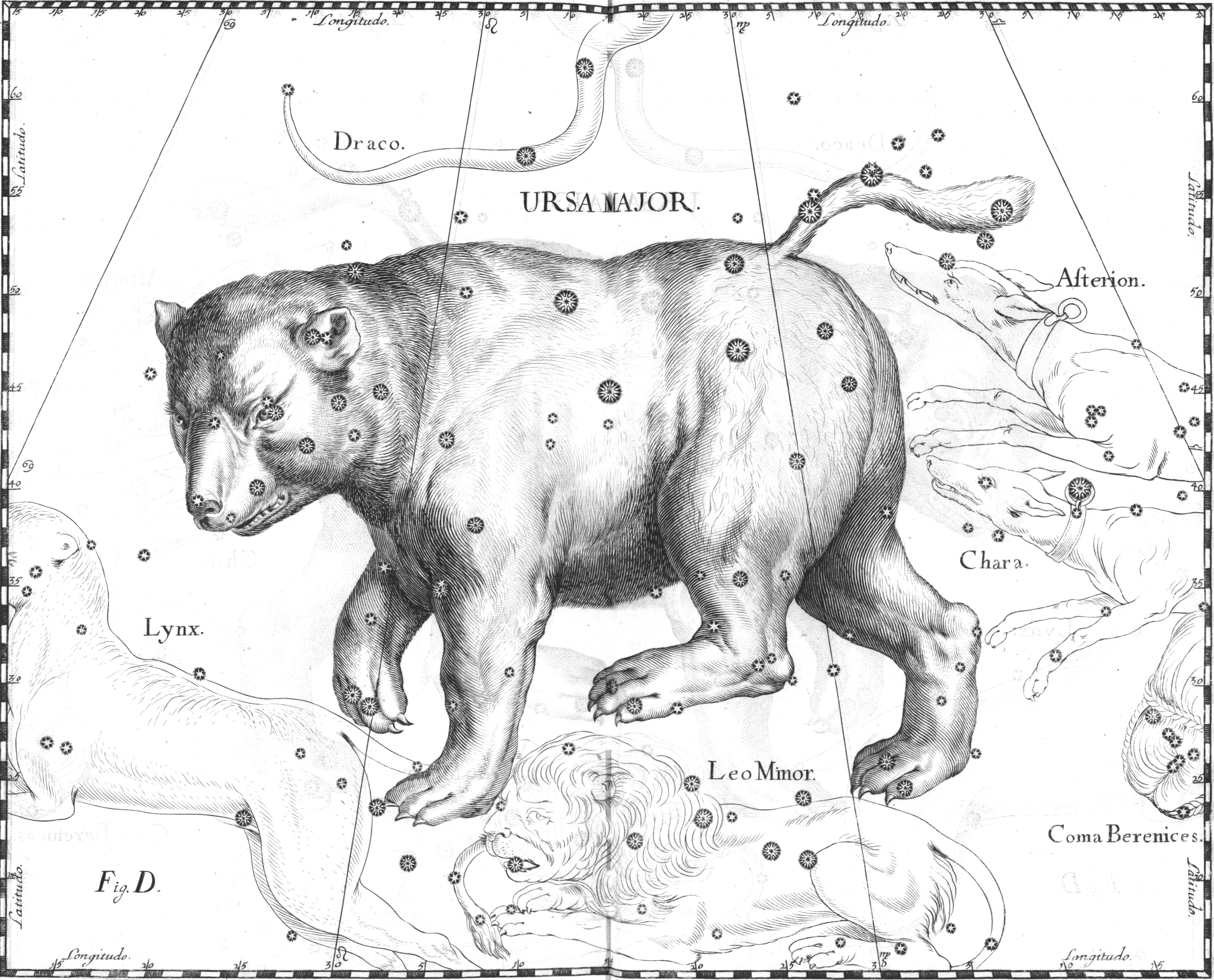
Johannes Hevelius drew Ursa Major as if being viewed from outside the celestial sphere.

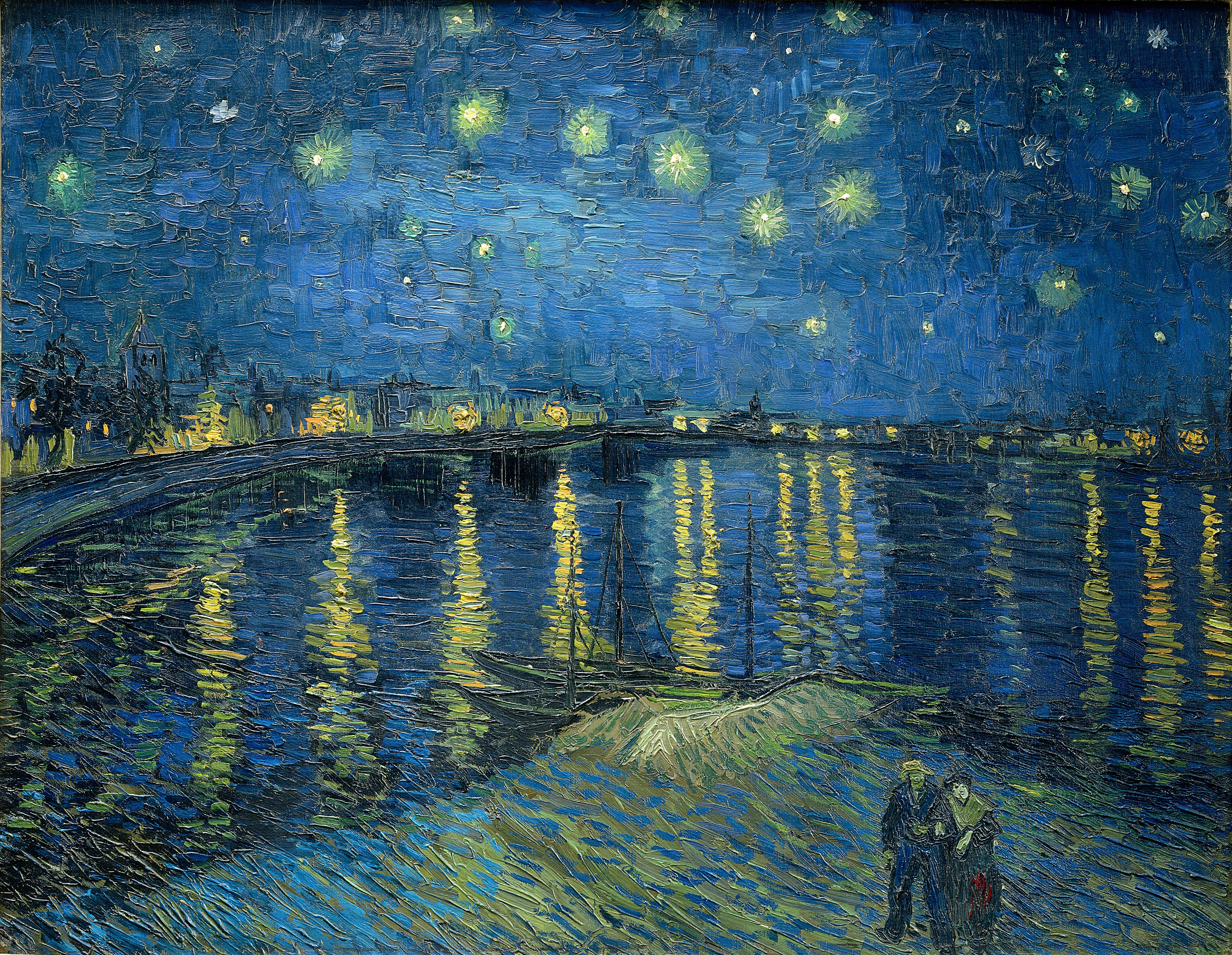
Starry Night Over the Rhone by Vincent van Gogh (1888)

Polaris and the Big Dipper on the flag of Alaska

Ursa Major is also pictured as the Starry Plough, the Irish flag of Labour, adopted by James Connolly's Irish Citizen Army in 1916, which shows the constellation on a blue background; on the state flag of Alaska; and on the House of Bernadotte's variation of the coat of arms of Sweden. The seven stars on a red background of the flag of the Community of Madrid, Spain, may be the stars of the Plough asterism (or of Ursa Minor). The same can be said of the seven stars pictured in the bordure azure of the coat of arms of Madrid, capital of that country.

== See also ==
- Ursa Major (Chinese astronomy)
- Ursa Minor
- Southern Cross
- Celestial cartography
- Constellation family
- Former constellations
- Lists of stars by constellation
- Constellations listed by Johannes Hevelius
- Constellations listed by Lacaille
- Constellations listed by Petrus Plancius
- Constellations listed by Ptolemy
